= Root of unity =

Number with an integer power equal to 1

The 5th roots of unity (blue points) in the complex plane

In mathematics, a root of unity is any complex number that yields 1 when raised to some positive integer power n. Roots of unity are used in many branches of mathematics, and are especially important in number theory, the theory of group characters, and the discrete Fourier transform. It is occasionally called a de Moivre number after French mathematician Abraham de Moivre.

Roots of unity can be defined in any field. If the characteristic of the field is zero, the roots are complex numbers that are also algebraic integers. For fields with a positive characteristic, the roots belong to a finite field, and, conversely, every nonzero element of a finite field is a root of unity. Any algebraically closed field contains exactly n nth roots of unity, except when n is a multiple of the (positive) characteristic of the field.

== General definition ==
Geometric representation of the 2nd to 6th root of a general complex number in polar form. For the nth root of unity, set r = 1 and φ = 0. The principal root is in black.

An nth root of unity, where n is a positive integer, is a number z satisfying the equation
$$z^n = 1.$$
Unless otherwise specified, the roots of unity may be taken to be complex numbers (including the number 1, and the number −1 if n is even, which are complex with a zero imaginary part), and in this case, the nth roots of unity are
$$\exp\left(\frac{2k\pi i}{n}\right)=\cos\frac{2k\pi}{n}+i\sin\frac{2k\pi}{n},\qquad k=0,1,\dots, n-1.$$

However, the defining equation of roots of unity is meaningful over any field (and even over any ring) F, and this allows considering roots of unity in F. If the characteristic of F is not 0, these roots belong to a finite field. Conversely, every nonzero element in a finite field is a root of unity in that field. See Root of unity modulo n and Finite field for further details.

An nth root of unity is said to be primitive if it is not an mth root of unity for some smaller m, that is if

$$z^n=1\quad \text{and} \quad z^m \ne 1 \text{ for } m = 1, 2, 3, \ldots, n-1.$$

If n is a prime number, then all nth roots of unity, except 1, are primitive.

In the above formula in terms of exponential and trigonometric functions, the primitive nth roots of unity are those for which k and n are coprime integers.

Subsequent sections of this article will comply with complex roots of unity. For the case of roots of unity in fields of nonzero characteristic, see Finite field § Roots of unity. For the case of roots of unity in rings of modular integers, see Root of unity modulo n.

== Elementary properties ==
Every nth root of unity z is a primitive ath root of unity for some a ≤ n, which is the smallest positive integer such that z^{a} = 1.

Any integer power of an nth root of unity is also an nth root of unity, as

$$\bigl(z^k\bigr)^n = z^{kn} = \bigl(z^n\bigr)^k = 1^k = 1.$$

This is also true for negative exponents. In particular, the reciprocal of an nth root of unity is its complex conjugate, and is also an nth root of unity:

$$\frac{1}{z} = z^{-1} = z^{n-1} = \bar z.$$

If z is an nth root of unity and a ≡ b (mod n) then z^{a} = z^{b}. Indeed, by the definition of congruence modulo n, a = b + kn for some integer k, and hence

$$z^a = z^{b+kn} = z^b z^{kn} = z^b \bigl(z^n\bigr)^k = z^b 1^k = z^b.$$

Therefore, given a power z^{a} of z, one has z^{a} = z^{r}, where 0 ≤ r < n is the remainder of the Euclidean division of a by n.

Let z be a primitive nth root of unity. Then the powers z, z^{2}, ..., z^{n−1}, z^{n} = z^{0} = 1 are nth roots of unity and are all distinct. (If z^{a} = z^{b} where 1 ≤ a < b ≤ n, then z^{b−a} = 1, which would imply that z would not be primitive.) This implies that z, z^{2}, ..., z^{n−1}, z^{n} = z^{0} = 1 are all of the nth roots of unity, since an nth-degree polynomial equation over a field (in this case the field of complex numbers) has at most n solutions.

From the preceding, it follows that, if z is a primitive nth root of unity, then $z^a = z^b$ if and only if $a\equiv b \pmod{ n}.$ If z is not primitive then $a\equiv b \pmod{ n}$ implies $z^a = z^b,$ but the converse may be false, as shown by the following example. If n = 4, a non-primitive nth root of unity is z = −1, and one has $z^2 = z^4 = 1$, although $2 \not\equiv 4 \pmod{4}.$

Let z be a primitive nth root of unity. A power w = z^{k} of z is a primitive ath root of unity for

$$a = \frac{n}{\gcd(k,n)},$$

where $\gcd(k,n)$ is the greatest common divisor of n and k. This results from the fact that ka is the smallest multiple of k that is also a multiple of n. In other words, ka is the least common multiple of k and n. Thus

$$a =\frac{\operatorname{lcm}(k,n)}{k}=\frac{kn}{k\gcd(k,n)}=\frac{n}{\gcd(k,n)}.$$

Thus, if k and n are coprime, z^{k} is also a primitive nth root of unity, and therefore there are φ(n) distinct primitive nth roots of unity (where φ is Euler's totient function). This implies that if n is a prime number, all the roots except +1 are primitive.

In other words, if R(n) is the set of all nth roots of unity and P(n) is the set of primitive ones, R(n) is a disjoint union of the P(n):

$$\operatorname{R}(n) = \bigcup_{d \,|\, n}\operatorname{P}(d),$$

where the notation means that d goes through all the positive divisors of n, including 1 and n.

Since the cardinality of R(n) is n, and that of P(n) is φ(n), this demonstrates the classical formula

$$\sum_{d \,|\, n}\varphi(d) = n.$$

== Group properties ==
=== Group of all roots of unity ===
The product and the multiplicative inverse of two roots of unity are also roots of unity. In fact, if x^{m} = 1 and y^{n} = 1, then (x^{−1})^{m} = 1, and (xy)^{k} = 1, where k is the least common multiple of m and n.

Therefore, the roots of unity form an abelian group under multiplication. This group is the torsion subgroup of the circle group.

=== Group of nth roots of unity ===
For an integer n, the product and the multiplicative inverse of two nth roots of unity are also nth roots of unity. Therefore, the nth roots of unity form an abelian group under multiplication.

Given a primitive nth root of unity ω, the other nth roots are powers of ω. This means that the group of the nth roots of unity is a cyclic group. It is worth remarking that the term of cyclic group originated from the fact that this group is a subgroup of the circle group.

=== Galois group of the primitive nth roots of unity ===
Let $\Q(\omega)$ be the field extension of the rational numbers generated over $\Q$ by a primitive nth root of unity ω. As every nth root of unity is a power of ω, the field $\Q(\omega)$ contains all nth roots of unity, and $\Q(\omega)$ is a Galois extension of $\Q.$

If k is an integer, ω^{k} is a primitive nth root of unity if and only if k and n are coprime. In this case, the map

$$\omega \mapsto \omega^k$$

induces an automorphism of $\Q(\omega)$, which maps every nth root of unity to its kth power. Every automorphism of $\Q(\omega)$ is obtained in this way, and these automorphisms form the Galois group of $\Q(\omega)$ over the field of the rationals.

The rules of exponentiation imply that the composition of two such automorphisms is obtained by multiplying the exponents. It follows that the map

$$k\mapsto \left(\omega \mapsto \omega^k\right)$$

defines a group isomorphism between the units of the ring of integers modulo n and the Galois group of $\Q(\omega).$

This shows that this Galois group is abelian, and implies thus that the primitive roots of unity may be expressed in terms of radicals.

=== Galois group of the real part of the primitive roots of unity ===
The real part of the primitive roots of unity are related to one another as roots of the minimal polynomial of $2\cos(2\pi/n).$ The roots of the minimal polynomial are just twice the real part; these roots form a cyclic Galois group.

== Trigonometric expression ==
The cube roots of unity

De Moivre's formula, which is valid for all real x and integers n, is

$$\left(\cos x + i \sin x\right)^n = \cos nx + i \sin nx.$$

Setting x = 2π/n gives a primitive nth root of unity – one gets

$$\left(\cos\frac{2\pi}{n} + i \sin\frac{2\pi}{n}\right)^{\!n} = \cos 2\pi + i \sin 2\pi = 1,$$

but

$$\left(\cos\frac{2\pi}{n} + i \sin\frac{2\pi}{n}\right)^{\!k} = \cos\frac{2k\pi}{n} + i \sin\frac{2k\pi}{n} \neq 1$$

for k = 1, 2, …, n − 1. In other words,

$$\cos\frac{2\pi}{n} + i \sin\frac{2\pi}{n}$$

is a primitive nth root of unity.

This formula shows that in the complex plane the nth roots of unity are at the vertices of a regular n-sided polygon inscribed in the unit circle, with one vertex at 1 (see the plot for n = 3 on the right). This geometric fact accounts for the term "cyclotomic" in such phrases as cyclotomic field and cyclotomic polynomial; it is from the Greek roots "cyclo" (circle) plus "tomos" (cut, divide).

Euler's formula

$$e^{i x} = \cos x + i \sin x,$$

which is valid for all real x, can be used to put the formula for the nth roots of unity into the form

$$e^{2\pi i \frac{k}{n}}, \quad 0 \le k < n.$$

It follows from the discussion in the previous section that this is a primitive nth-root if and only if the fraction k/n is in lowest terms; that is, that k and n are coprime. An irrational number that can be expressed as the real part of the root of unity; that is, as $\cos(2\pi k/n)$, is called a trigonometric number.

== Algebraic expression ==
The nth roots of unity are, by definition, the roots of the polynomial x^{n} − 1, and are thus algebraic numbers. As this polynomial is not irreducible (except for n = 1), the primitive nth roots of unity are roots of an irreducible polynomial (over the integers) of lower degree, called the nth cyclotomic polynomial, and often denoted Φ_{n}. The degree of Φ_{n} is given by Euler's totient function, which counts (among other things) the number of primitive nth roots of unity. The roots of Φ_{n} are exactly the primitive nth roots of unity.

Galois theory can be used to show that the cyclotomic polynomials may be conveniently solved in terms of radicals. (The trivial form $\sqrt[n]{1}$ is not convenient, because it contains non-primitive roots, such as 1, which are not roots of the cyclotomic polynomial, and because it does not give the real and imaginary parts separately.) This means that, for each positive integer n, there exists an expression built from integers by root extractions, additions, subtractions, multiplications, and divisions (and nothing else), such that the primitive nth roots of unity are exactly the set of values that can be obtained by choosing values for the root extractions (k possible values for a kth root). (For more details see § Cyclotomic fields, below.)

Gauss proved that a primitive nth root of unity can be expressed using only square roots, addition, subtraction, multiplication and division if and only if it is possible to construct with compass and straightedge the regular n-gon. This is the case if and only if n is either a power of two or the product of a power of two and Fermat primes that are all different.

If z is a primitive nth root of unity, the same is true for 1/z, and $r=z+\frac 1z$ is twice the real part of z. In other words, Φ_{n} is a reciprocal polynomial, the polynomial $R_n$ that has r as a root may be deduced from Φ_{n} by the standard manipulation on reciprocal polynomials, and the primitive nth roots of unity may be deduced from the roots of $R_n$ by solving the quadratic equation $z^2-rz+1=0.$ That is, the real part of the primitive root is $\frac r2,$ and its imaginary part is $\pm i\sqrt{1-\left(\frac r2\right)^2}.$

The polynomial $R_n$ is an irreducible polynomial whose roots are all real. Its degree is a power of two, if and only if n is a product of a power of two by a product (possibly empty) of distinct Fermat primes, and the regular n-gon is constructible with compass and straightedge. Otherwise, it is solvable in radicals, but one are in the casus irreducibilis, that is, every expression of the roots in terms of radicals involves nonreal radicals.

=== Explicit expressions in low degrees ===
- For n = 1, the cyclotomic polynomial is Φ_{1}(x) = x − 1 Therefore, the only primitive first root of unity is 1, which is a non-primitive nth root of unity for every n > 1.
- As Φ_{2}(x) = x + 1, the only primitive second (square) root of unity is −1, which is also a non-primitive nth root of unity for every even n > 2. With the preceding case, this completes the list of real roots of unity.
- As Φ_{3}(x) = x^{2} + x + 1, the primitive third (cube) roots of unity, which are the roots of this quadratic polynomial, are
  $$\frac{-1 + i \sqrt{3}}{2},\ \frac{-1 - i \sqrt{3}}{2} .$$
- As Φ_{4}(x) = x^{2} + 1, the two primitive fourth roots of unity are i and −i.
- As Φ_{5}(x) = x^{4} + x^{3} + x^{2} + x + 1, the four primitive fifth roots of unity are the roots of this quartic polynomial, which may be explicitly solved in terms of radicals, giving the roots
  $$\frac{\varepsilon\sqrt 5 - 1}4 \pm i \frac{\sqrt{10 + 2\varepsilon\sqrt 5}}{4},$$
  where $\varepsilon$ may take the two values 1 and −1 (the same value in the two occurrences).
- As Φ_{6}(x) = x^{2} − x + 1, there are two primitive sixth roots of unity, which are the negatives (and also the square roots) of the two primitive cube roots:
  $$\frac{1 + i \sqrt{3}}{2},\ \frac{1 - i \sqrt{3}}{2}.$$
- As 7 is not a Fermat prime, the seventh roots of unity are the first that require cube roots. There are 6 primitive seventh roots of unity, which are pairwise complex conjugate. The sum of a root and its conjugate is twice its real part. These three sums are the three real roots of the cubic polynomial $r^3+r^2-2r-1,$ and the primitive seventh roots of unity are
  $$\frac{r}{2}\pm i\sqrt{1-\frac{r^2}{4}},$$
  where r runs over the roots of the above polynomial. As for every cubic polynomial, these roots may be expressed in terms of square and cube roots. However, as these three roots are all real, this is casus irreducibilis, and any such expression involves non-real cube roots.
- As Φ_{8}(x) = x^{4} + 1, the four primitive eighth roots of unity are the square roots of the primitive fourth roots, ± i. They are thus
  $$\pm\frac{\sqrt{2}}{2} \pm i\frac{\sqrt{2}}{2}.$$
- See Heptadecagon for the real part of a 17th root of unity.

== Periodicity ==
If z is a primitive nth root of unity, then the sequence of powers

… , z^{−1}, z^{0}, z^{1}, …

is n-periodic (because z^{j + n} = z^{j}z^{n} = z^{j} for all values of j), and the n sequences of powers

s_{k}: … , z^{k⋅(−1)}, z^{k⋅0}, z^{k⋅1}, …

for k = 1, … , n are all n-periodic (because z^{k⋅(j + n)} = z^{k⋅j}). Furthermore, the set {s_{1}, … , s_{n}} of these sequences is a basis of the linear space of all n-periodic sequences. This means that any n-periodic sequence of complex numbers

… , x_{−1} , x_{0} , x_{1}, …

can be expressed as a linear combination of powers of a primitive nth root of unity:

$$x_j = \sum_k X_k \cdot z^{k \cdot j} = X_1 z^{1\cdot j} + \cdots + X_n \cdot z^{n \cdot j}$$

for some complex numbers X_{1}, … , X_{n} and every integer j.

This is a form of Fourier analysis. If j is a (discrete) time variable, then k is a frequency and X_{k} is a complex amplitude.

Choosing for the primitive nth root of unity

$$z = e^\frac{2\pi i}{n} = \cos\frac{2\pi}{n} + i \sin\frac{2\pi}{n}$$

allows x_{j} to be expressed as a linear combination of cos and sin:

$$x_j = \sum_k A_k \cos \frac{2\pi jk}{n} + \sum_k B_k \sin \frac{2\pi jk}{n}.$$

This is a discrete Fourier transform.

== Summation ==
Let SR(n) be the sum of all the nth roots of unity, primitive or not. Then

$$\operatorname{SR}(n) =
\begin{cases}
1, & n=1\\
0, & n>1.
\end{cases}$$

This is an immediate consequence of Vieta's formulas. In fact, the nth roots of unity being the roots of the polynomial X^{n} − 1, their sum is the coefficient of degree n − 1, which is either 1 or 0 according whether n = 1 or n > 1.

Alternatively, for n = 1 there is nothing to prove, and for n > 1 there exists a root z ≠ 1 – since the set S of all the nth roots of unity is a group, z S = S, so the sum satisfies z SR(n) = SR(n), whence SR(n) = 0.

Let SP(n) be the sum of all the primitive nth roots of unity. Then

$$\operatorname{SP}(n) = \mu(n),$$

where μ(n) is the Möbius function.

In the section Elementary properties, it was shown that if R(n) is the set of all nth roots of unity and P(n) is the set of primitive ones, R(n) is a disjoint union of the P(n):

$$\operatorname{R}(n) = \bigcup_{d \,|\, n}\operatorname{P}(d),$$

This implies

$$\operatorname{SR}(n) = \sum_{d \,|\, n}\operatorname{SP}(d).$$

Applying the Möbius inversion formula gives

$$\operatorname{SP}(n) = \sum_{d \,|\, n}\mu(d)\operatorname{SR}\left(\frac{n}{d}\right).$$

In this formula, if d < n, then SR(n/d) = 0, and for d = n: SR(n/d) = 1. Therefore, SP(n) = μ(n).

This is the special case c_{n}(1) of Ramanujan's sum c_{n}(s), defined as the sum of the sth powers of the primitive nth roots of unity:

$$c_n(s) = \sum_{a = 1 \atop \gcd(a, n) = 1}^n e^{2 \pi i \frac{a}{n} s}.$$

== Orthogonality ==
From the summation formula follows an orthogonality relationship: for j = 1, … , n and j′ = 1, … , n

$$\sum_{k=1}^{n} \overline{z^{j\cdot k}} \cdot z^{j'\cdot k} = n \cdot\delta_{j,j'}$$

where δ is the Kronecker delta and z is any primitive nth root of unity.

The n × n matrix U whose (j, k)th entry is

$$U_{j,k} = n^{-\frac{1}{2}}\cdot z^{j\cdot k}$$

defines a discrete Fourier transform. Computing the inverse transformation using Gaussian elimination requires O(n^{3}) operations. However, it follows from the orthogonality that U is unitary. That is,

$$\sum_{k=1}^{n} \overline{U_{j,k}} \cdot U_{k,j'} = \delta_{j,j'},$$

and thus the inverse of U is simply the complex conjugate. (This fact was first noted by Gauss when solving the problem of trigonometric interpolation.) The straightforward application of U or its inverse to a given vector requires O(n^{2}) operations. The fast Fourier transform algorithms reduces the number of operations further to O(n log n).

== Cyclotomic polynomials ==
The zeros of the polynomial

$$p(z) = z^n - 1$$

are precisely the nth roots of unity, each with multiplicity 1. The nth cyclotomic polynomial is defined by the fact that its zeros are precisely the primitive nth roots of unity, each with multiplicity 1.

$$\Phi_n(z) = \prod_{k=1}^{\varphi(n)}(z-z_k)$$

where z_{1}, z_{2}, z_{3}, …, z_{φ(n)} are the primitive nth roots of unity, and φ(n) is Euler's totient function. The polynomial Φ_{n}(z) has integer coefficients and is an irreducible polynomial over the rational numbers (that is, it cannot be written as the product of two positive-degree polynomials with rational coefficients). The case of prime n, which is easier than the general assertion, follows by applying Eisenstein's criterion to the polynomial

$$\frac{(z+1)^n - 1}{(z+1) - 1},$$

and expanding via the binomial theorem.

Every nth root of unity is a primitive dth root of unity for exactly one positive divisor d of n. This implies that

$$z^n - 1 = \prod_{d \,|\, n} \Phi_d(z).$$

This formula represents the factorization of the polynomial z^{n} − 1 into irreducible factors:

$$\begin{align}
z^1 -1 &= z-1 \\
z^2 -1 &= (z-1)(z+1) \\
z^3 -1 &= (z-1) (z^2 + z + 1) \\
z^4 -1 &= (z-1)(z+1) (z^2+1) \\
z^5 -1 &= (z-1) (z^4 + z^3 +z^2 + z + 1) \\
z^6 -1 &= (z-1)(z+1) (z^2 + z + 1) (z^2 - z + 1)\\
z^7 -1 &= (z-1) (z^6+ z^5 + z^4 + z^3 + z^2 + z + 1) \\
z^8 -1 &= (z-1)(z+1) (z^2+1) (z^4+1)  \\
\end{align}$$

Applying Möbius inversion to the formula gives

$$\Phi_n(z) = \prod_{d \,|\, n}\left(z^\frac{n}{d} - 1\right)^{\mu(d)} = \prod_{d \,|\, n}\left(z^d - 1\right)^{\mu\left(\frac{n}{d}\right)},$$

where μ is the Möbius function. So the first few cyclotomic polynomials are

Φ_{1}(z) = z − 1
Φ_{2}(z) = (z^{2} − 1)⋅(z − 1)^{−1} = z + 1
Φ_{3}(z) = (z^{3} − 1)⋅(z − 1)^{−1} = z^{2} + z + 1
Φ_{4}(z) = (z^{4} − 1)⋅(z^{2} − 1)^{−1} = z^{2} + 1
Φ_{5}(z) = (z^{5} − 1)⋅(z − 1)^{−1} = z^{4} + z^{3} + z^{2} + z + 1
Φ_{6}(z) = (z^{6} − 1)⋅(z^{3} − 1)^{−1}⋅(z^{2} − 1)^{−1}⋅(z − 1) = z^{2} − z + 1
Φ_{7}(z) = (z^{7} − 1)⋅(z − 1)^{−1} = z^{6} + z^{5} + z^{4} + z^{3} + z^{2} +z + 1
Φ_{8}(z) = (z^{8} − 1)⋅(z^{4} − 1)^{−1} = z^{4} + 1

If p is a prime number, then all the pth roots of unity except 1 are primitive pth roots. Therefore,
$$\Phi_p(z) = \frac{z^p - 1}{z - 1} = \sum_{k = 0}^{p - 1} z^k.$$
Substituting any positive integer ≥ 2 for z, this sum becomes a base z repunit. Thus a necessary (but not sufficient) condition for a repunit to be prime is that its length be prime.

Note that, contrary to first appearances, not all coefficients of all cyclotomic polynomials are 0, 1, or −1. The first exception is Φ_{105}. It is not a surprise it takes this long to get an example, because the behavior of the coefficients depends not so much on n as on how many odd prime factors appear in n. More precisely, it can be shown that if n has 1 or 2 odd prime factors (for example, n = 150) then the nth cyclotomic polynomial only has coefficients 0, 1 or −1. Thus the first conceivable n for which there could be a coefficient besides 0, 1, or −1 is a product of the three smallest odd primes, and that is 3 ⋅ 5 ⋅ 7 = 105. This by itself doesn't prove the 105th polynomial has another coefficient, but does show it is the first one which even has a chance of working (and then a computation of the coefficients shows it does). A theorem of Schur says that there are cyclotomic polynomials with coefficients arbitrarily large in absolute value. In particular, if $n = p_1 p_2 \cdots p_t,$ where $p_1 < p_2 < \cdots < p_t$ are odd primes, $p_1 +p_2>p_t,$ and t is odd, then 1 − t occurs as a coefficient in the nth cyclotomic polynomial.

Many restrictions are known about the values that cyclotomic polynomials can assume at integer values. For example, if p is prime, then d ∣ Φ_{p}(d) if and only if d ≡ 1 (mod p).

Cyclotomic polynomials are solvable in radicals, as roots of unity are themselves radicals. Moreover, there exist more informative radical expressions for nth roots of unity with the additional property that every value of the expression obtained by choosing values of the radicals (for example, signs of square roots) is a primitive nth root of unity. This was already shown by Gauss in 1797. Efficient algorithms exist for calculating such expressions.

== Cyclic groups ==
The nth roots of unity form under multiplication a cyclic group of order n, and in fact these groups comprise all of the finite subgroups of the multiplicative group of the complex number field. A generator for this cyclic group is a primitive nth root of unity.

The nth roots of unity form an irreducible representation of any cyclic group of order n. The orthogonality relationship also follows from group-theoretic principles as described in Character group.

The roots of unity appear as entries of the eigenvectors of any circulant matrix; that is, matrices that are invariant under cyclic shifts, a fact that also follows from group representation theory as a variant of Bloch's theorem. In particular, if a circulant Hermitian matrix is considered (for example, a discretized one-dimensional Laplacian with periodic boundaries), the orthogonality property immediately follows from the usual orthogonality of eigenvectors of Hermitian matrices.

== Cyclotomic fields ==
By adjoining a primitive nth root of unity to $\Q,$ one obtains the nth cyclotomic field $\Q(\exp(2\pi i/n)).$This field contains all nth roots of unity and is the splitting field of the nth cyclotomic polynomial over $\Q.$ The field extension $\Q(\exp(2\pi i /n))/\Q$ has degree φ(n) and its Galois group is naturally isomorphic to the multiplicative group of units of the ring $\Z/n\Z.$

As the Galois group of $\Q(\exp(2\pi i /n))/\Q$ is abelian, this is an abelian extension. Every subfield of a cyclotomic field is an abelian extension of the rationals. It follows that every nth root of unity may be expressed in term of k-roots, with various k not exceeding φ(n). In these cases Galois theory can be written out explicitly in terms of Gaussian periods: this theory from the Disquisitiones Arithmeticae of Gauss was published many years before Galois.

Conversely, every abelian extension of the rationals is such a subfield of a cyclotomic field – this is the content of a theorem of Kronecker, usually called the Kronecker–Weber theorem on the grounds that Weber completed the proof.

== Relation to quadratic integers ==
In the complex plane, the red points are the fifth roots of unity, and the black points are the sums of a fifth root of unity and its complex conjugate.

In the complex plane, the corners of the two squares are the eighth roots of unity.

For n = 1, 2, both roots of unity 1 and −1 are integers.

For three values of n, the roots of unity are quadratic integers:

- For n = 3, 6 they are Eisenstein integers (D = −3).
- For n = 4 they are Gaussian integers (D = −1): see Imaginary unit.

For four other values of n, the primitive roots of unity are not quadratic integers, but the sum of any root of unity with its complex conjugate (also an nth root of unity) is a quadratic integer.

For n = 5, 10, none of the non-real roots of unity (which satisfy a quartic equation) is a quadratic integer, but the sum z + z̅ = 2 Re z of each root with its complex conjugate (also a 5th root of unity) is an element of the ring Z[(1 + √5)/2] (D = 5). For two pairs of non-real 5th roots of unity these sums are inverse golden ratio and minus golden ratio.

For n = 8, for any root of unity z + z̅ equals to either 0, ±2, or ±√2 (D = 2).

For n = 12, for any root of unity, z + z̅ equals to either 0, ±1, ±2 or ±√3 (D = 3).

== See also ==
- Argand system
- Circle group, the unit complex numbers
- Cyclotomic field
- Group scheme of roots of unity
- Dirichlet character
- Ramanujan's sum
- Root of unity modulo n
- Witt vector
- Teichmüller character
