= Perron's irreducibility criterion =

Condition for polynomials to be unfactorable

Perron's irreducibility criterion is a sufficient condition for a polynomial to be irreducible in $\mathbb{Z}[x]$—that is, for it to be unfactorable into the product of lower-degree polynomials with integer coefficients.

This criterion is applicable only to monic polynomials. However, unlike other commonly used criteria, Perron's criterion does not require any knowledge of prime decomposition of the polynomial's coefficients.

== Criterion ==
Suppose we have the following polynomial with integer coefficients

$$f(x)=x^n+a_{n-1}x^{n-1}+\cdots+a_1x+a_0,$$

where $a_0\neq 0$. If either of the following two conditions applies:

- $|a_{n-1}|> 1+|a_{n-2}|+\cdots+|a_0|$
- $|a_{n-1}|= 1+|a_{n-2}|+\cdots+|a_0|, \quad f(\pm 1) \neq 0$

then $f$ is irreducible over the integers (and by Gauss's lemma also over the rational numbers).

== History ==
The criterion was first published by Oskar Perron in 1907 in Journal für die reine und angewandte Mathematik.

== Proof ==
A short proof can be given based on the following lemma due to Panaitopol:

Lemma. Let $f(x)=x^n+a_{n-1}x^{n-1}+\cdots+a_1x+a_0$ be a polynomial with $|a_{n-1}|>1+|a_{n-2}|+\cdots+|a_{1}|+|a_0|$. Then exactly one zero $z$ of $f$ satisfies $|z|>1$, and the other $n-1$ zeroes of $f$ satisfy $|z|<1$.

Suppose that $f(x)=g(x)h(x)$ where $g$ and $h$ are integer polynomials. Since, by the above lemma, $f$ has only one zero with modulus not less than $1$, one of the polynomials $g, h$ has all its zeroes strictly inside the unit circle. Suppose that $z_1,\dots,z_k$ are the zeroes of $g$, and $|z_1|,\dots,|z_k|<1$. Note that $g(0)$ is a nonzero integer, and $|g(0)|=|z_1\cdots z_k|<1$, contradiction. Therefore, $f$ is irreducible.

== Generalizations ==
In his publication Perron provided variants of the criterion for multivariate polynomials over arbitrary fields. In 2010, Bonciocat published novel proofs of these criteria.

== See also ==
- Eisenstein's criterion
- Cohn's irreducibility criterion
