= Mignotte bound =

In algebra, a Mignotte bound can refer to

- a bound on coefficients of factor polynomials, see Landau-Mignotte bound,
- Mignotte's separation bound for zeros of a polynomial.
