= Moessner's theorem =

Theorem in number theory

In number theory, Moessner's theorem or Moessner's magic is related to an arithmetical algorithm to produce an infinite sequence of the exponents of positive integers $1^n, 2^n, 3^n, 4^n, \cdots ~,$ with $n \geq 1 ~,$ by recursively manipulating the sequence of integers algebraically. The algorithm was first published by Alfred Moessner in 1951; the first proof of its validity was given by Oskar Perron that same year.

For example, for $n=2$, one can remove every even number, resulting in $(1,3,5,7\cdots)$, and then add each odd number to the sum of all previous elements, providing $(1,4,9,16,\cdots)=(1^2,2^2,3^2,4^2\cdots)$.

== Construction ==
Write down every positive integer and remove every $n$-th element, with $n$ a positive integer. Build a new sequence of partial sums with the remaining numbers. Continue by removing every $(n-1)$-st element in the new sequence and producing a new sequence of partial sums. For the sequence $k$, remove the $(n-k+1)$-st elements and produce a new sequence of partial sums.

The procedure stops at the $n$-th sequence. The remaining sequence will correspond to $1^n, 2^n, 3^n, 4^n \cdots~.$

=== Example ===
The initial sequence is the sequence of positive integers,

$$1, 2, 3, 4, 5, 6, 7, 8, 9, 10, 11, 12, 13, 14, 15, 16 \cdots ~.$$

For $n=4$, we remove every fourth number from the sequence of integers and add up each element to the sum of the previous elements

$$1,2,3,5,6,7,9,10,11,13,14,15 \cdots \to 1,3,6,11,17,24,33,43,54,67,81,96 \cdots$$

Now we remove every third element and continue to add up the partial sums

$$1,3,11,17,33,43,67,81 \cdots \to 1,4,15,32,65,108,175,256 \cdots$$

Remove every second element and continue to add up the partial sums

$$1,15,65,175 \cdots \to 1,16,81,256 \cdots$$,

which recovers $1^4, 2^4,3^4,4^4, \cdots$.

=== Variants ===
If the triangular numbers are removed instead, a similar procedure leads to the sequence of factorials $1!, 2!,3!,4!,\cdots~.$
