= Georgi Bradistilov =

Georgi Delchev Bradistilov
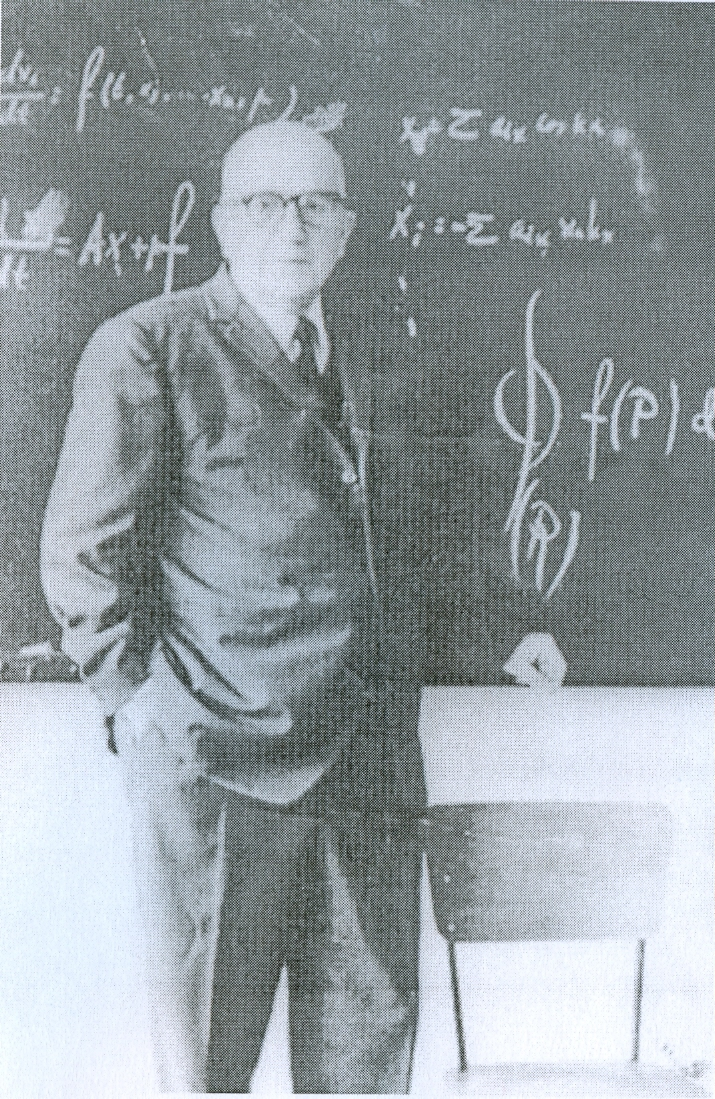
- Born: 12 October 1904 O.S. Panagyurishte, Principality of Bulgaria
- Died: 18 June 1977 (aged 72); Sofia, People's Republic of Bulgaria
- Resting place: Central Sofia Cemetery; 42°42.788′N 23°20.077′E
- Education: Sofia University; Ludwig-Maximilians-Universität München
- Spouse: Dobrina Bradistilova
- Parents: Delcho Petkov Bradistilov (1866 – 1927) (father); Nona Georgieva (Motekova) Bradistilova (1876 – 1958) (mother)
- Relatives: Petko D. Bradistilov (1894 – 1919) (brother); Penka D. Bradistilova (1897 – 1972) (sister); Rayna D. Bradistilova (1901 – 1923) (sister)
- Scientific career
- Fields: Mathematics
- Workplaces: Sofia University; Sorbonne; Ludwig-Maximilians-Universität München; Technical University of Sofia
- Thesis: Über periodische und asymptotische Lösungen beim n-fachen Pendel in der Ebene (1938)
- Doctoral advisor: Oskar Perron

Georgi Delchev Bradistilov (Bulgarian: Георги Делчев Брадистилов; 25 October 1904 [12 October 1904 O.S.] – 18 June 1977) was a Bulgarian mathematician.

== Biography ==
Georgi Bradistilov, the fourth and youngest child in the family of the high-ranked civil servant at Bulgarian Ministry of Finance, Delcho Petkov Bradistilov (1866 – 1927), and teacher Nona Georgieva Bradistilova (née Motekova) (1876 – 1958), was born on 12 October 1904 OS in Panagyurishte. He attended 3rd Sofia gymnasium and in 1922 entered Sofia University to study physics and mathematics. In 1927, he graduated with honors and the same year was appointed as assistant professor in mathematics. In the 1930s he studied at the University of Paris and the Ludwig-Maximilians-Universität München. Bradistilov was one of the last students to take Arnold Sommerfeld's course in theoretical physics before his retirement. In 1938, he defended his doctorate, with Oskar Perron as advisor, at the Ludwig-Maximilians-Universität München.

Upon his return to Bulgaria Dr Bradistilov taught as private docent at his alma mater Sofia University. In 1943, he joined as extraordinary professor and later as full professor the newly established Higher Technical School in Sofia, which after the Second World War was renamed the State Polytechnic. Apart from his teaching duties, he wrote the basic mathematics textbooks used for many years by future Bulgarian engineers.

He was rector of the State Polytechnic in Sofia from 1947 to 1948 and rector of the Technical University of Sofia from 1962 to 1966. In 1958, he was awarded Doctor of Mathematics and Physics Science Degree. In 1966, he was elected corresponding member of the Bulgarian Academy of Sciences.

Georgi Bradistilov's contributions to applied mathematics are related to nonlinear differential equations and their applications to mechanics and electrotechnics, to electrostatic potential, to nonlinear oscillations.

He was notorious for his sense of humour and openness, for his love of arts and nature as well as for his refined taste, his wife being an artist educated in Florence.

== Honors ==
During his lifetime Georgi Bradistilov received many Bulgarian state decorations and awards. Recently a street in Sofia near the Technical University was named after him.

== Selected bibliography ==
- Bradistilov, G. (1939). "Über periodische und asymptotische Lösungen beim n-fachen Pendel in der Ebene". Math. Annalen (in German). 116 (2): 181–203. doi:10.1007/BF01597354 – via digizeitschriften.de.
- Bradistilov, G. (1939). "Über periodische Bewengungen beim n-fachen Pendel in der Ebene". Math. Annalen (in German). 116 (2): 602–609. doi:10.1007/BF01597378 – via digizeitschriften.de.
- Bradistilov, G. (1940). "Zur Berechnung der elektrostatischen Potentiale im Fluoritgitter". Zeitschrift für Kristallographie (in German). 102 (1–6): 26–46. doi:10.1524/zkri.1940.102.1.26.
- Брадистилов, Георги (1941). "Ролята на математическия анализ в проблемите на биологията". Годишник на Софийския университет. Физико-математически факултет. Книга 1- Математика и физика; Annuaire de l'Université de Sofia. Faculté Physico-mathématique. Livre 1 - (Mathématique et physique) (in Bulgarian). 37: 117–130.
- Брадистилов, Г.; Странски, И. Н. (1940). "Върху равновесната форма на флуоритния кристал". Годишник на Софийския университет. Физико-математически факултет. Книга 2 - Химия; Annuaire de l'Université de Sofia. Faculté Physico-mathématique. Livre 2 - Chimie (in Bulgarian and German). 36: 175–210.
- Bradistilov, G.; Stranski, I. (1941). "Über die Gleichgewichtsform des Fluoritkristalls". Zeitschrift für Kristallographie (in German). 103 (1–6): 1–29. doi:10.1524/zkri.1941.103.1.1.
- Bradistilov, G.; Boyadjiev, G. (1959). "Existenz periodischer Bewegungen eines n-fachen Pendels im Falle, daß einige Wurzeln seiner charakteristischen Gleichung ein Vielfaches einer anderen sind". Zeitschrift für Angewandte Mathematik und Mechanik (in German). 39 (7–8): 284–290. Bibcode:1959ZaMM...39..284B. doi:10.1002/zamm.19590390704.
- Bradistilov, Georgi (1954). Higher Mathematics [Vissha matematika] (in Bulgarian). Sofia: Dŭrzh. izd-vo "Nauka i izkustvo". OCLC 71225134.

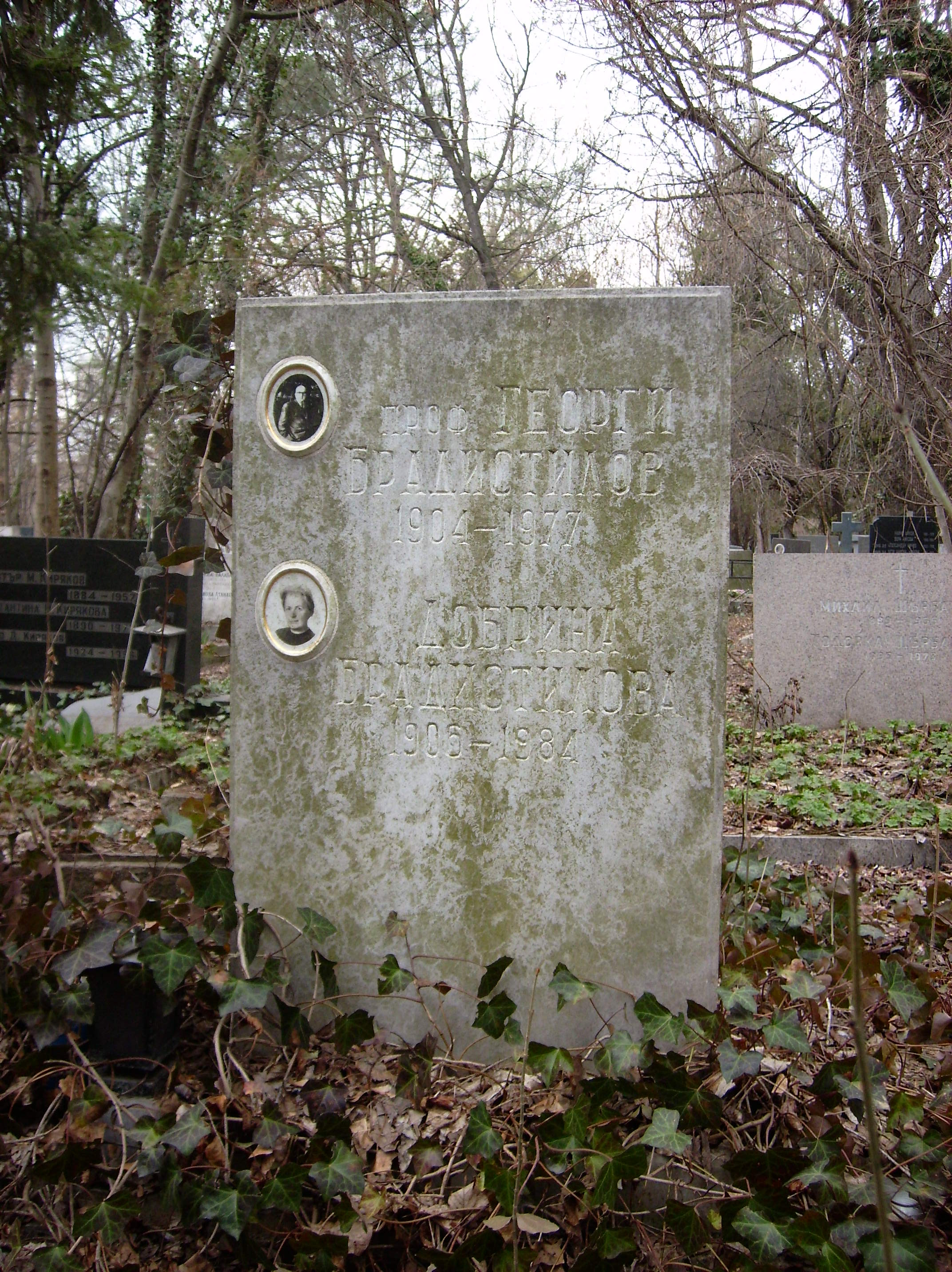
The grave of Georgi Bradistilov and his wife Dobrina Bradistilova at Sofia Central Cemetery (42°42.788′N 23°20.077′E)
