= Oskar Perron =

German mathematician (1880–1975)

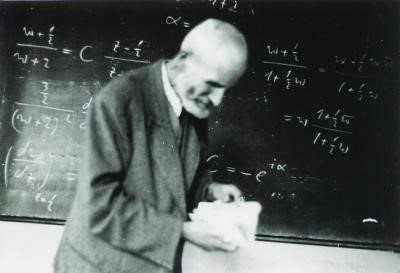
- Perron in 1948; Photo courtesy MFO
- Born: 7 May 1880; Frankenthal
- Died: 22 February 1975 (aged 94); Munich
- Education: Ludwig-Maximilians-Universität München
- Known for: Perron's paradox Perron effect Perron's formula Perron integral Perron method Perron number Perron tree Perron's irreducibility criterion Perron–Frobenius theorem Moessner's theorem
- Scientific career
- Fields: Mathematics
- Workplaces: Heidelberg University; Ludwig-Maximilians-Universität München
- Doctoral advisor: Ferdinand von Lindemann
- Doctoral students: Helmut Röhrl; Georgi Bradistilov

Oskar Perron (7 May 1880 – 22 February 1975) was a German mathematician.

He was a professor at the University of Heidelberg from 1914 to 1922 and at the Ludwig-Maximilians-Universität München from 1922 to 1951. He made numerous contributions to differential equations and partial differential equations, including the Perron method to solve the Dirichlet problem for elliptic partial differential equations. He wrote an encyclopedic book on continued fractions Die Lehre von den Kettenbrüchen. He introduced Perron's paradox to illustrate the danger of assuming that the solution of an optimization problem exists:

Let N be the largest positive integer. If N > 1, then N^{2} > N, contradicting the definition of N. Hence N = 1.

== Works ==
- Über die Drehung eines starren Körpers um seinen Schwerpunkt bei Wirkung äußerer Kräfte, Dissertation, Ludwig-Maximilians-Universität München, 1902
- Grundlagen für eine Theorie der Jacobischen Kettenbruchalgorithmus, Habilitationsschrift Leipzig 1906
- Die Lehre von den Kettenbrüchen, 2 vols., 1913, 3rd edn. Teubner Verlag 1954 (vol. 1 Elementare Kettenbrüche, vol. 2 analytische und funktionentheoretische Kettenbrüche)
- Irrationalzahlen, 1921, 2nd edn. 1939, 4th edn. de Gruyter, Berlin 1960
- Algebra I, II, Sammlung Göschen 1927, 3rd edn, 1951
- with Evelyn Frank: Frank, Evelyn; Perron, Oskar (1954). "Remark on a certain class of continued fractions". Proc. Amer. Math. Soc. 5 (2): 270–283. doi:10.1090/s0002-9939-1954-0061185-4. MR 0061185.
- Nichteuklidische Elementargeometrie der Ebene, Teubner, Stuttgart 1962

== Sources ==
- Edmund Hlawka: Das Werk Perrons auf dem Gebiete der diophantischen Approximationen. Jahresbericht der DMV 80, 1978, S. 1–12
- Josef Heinhold: Oskar Perron, Jahresbericht der DMV 90, 1988, S. 184–199 (in der DML Bielefeld: )
- Freddy Litten: Oskar Perron – Ein Beispiel von Zivilcourage im Dritten Reich, Mitteilungen der DMV Heft 3, 1994, S. 11–12; erweitert in: Frankenthal einst und jetzt, 1995, S. 26–28 (auf der Homepage von Litten: )
- Leon Bernstein: The modified algorithm of Jacobi-Perron. Memoirs of the AMS 67, Providence, 1966
- Leon Bernstein: The Jacobi-Perron algorithm - its theory and application. Lecture Notes Math. 207, Springer-Verlag, 1971

== See also ==
- Analytic hierarchy process
- Keller's conjecture
- Stieltjes transformation
- Jacobi–Perron algorithm
