= Perron method =

Mathematical technique

In the mathematical study of harmonic functions, the Perron method, also known as the method of subharmonic functions, is a technique introduced by Oskar Perron for the solution of the Dirichlet problem for Laplace's equation. The Perron method works by finding the largest subharmonic function with boundary values below the desired values; the "Perron solution" coincides with the actual solution of the Dirichlet problem if the problem is soluble.

The Dirichlet problem is to find a harmonic function in a domain, with boundary conditions given by a continuous function $\varphi(x)$. The Perron solution is defined by taking the pointwise supremum over a family of functions $S_\varphi$,

$$u(x) = \sup_{v \in S_\varphi} v(x)$$

where $S_\varphi$ is the set of all subharmonic functions such that $v(x) \leq \varphi(x)$ on the boundary of the domain.

The Perron solution u(x) is always harmonic; however, the values it takes on the boundary may not be the same as the desired boundary values $\varphi(x)$. A point y of the boundary satisfies a barrier condition if there exists a superharmonic function $w_y(x)$, defined on the entire domain, such that $w_y(y)=0$ and $w_y(x) > 0$ for all $x \ne y$. Points satisfying the barrier condition are called regular points of the boundary for the Laplacian. These are precisely the points at which one is guaranteed to obtain the desired boundary values: as $x\rightarrow y, u(x) \rightarrow \varphi(y)$.

The characterization of regular points on surfaces is part of potential theory. Regular points on the boundary of a domain $\Omega$ are those points that satisfy the Wiener criterion: for any $\lambda \in (0,1)$, let $C_j$ be the capacity of the set $B_{\lambda^j}(x_0) \cap \Omega^c$; then $x_0$ is a regular point if and only if

$$\sum_{j=0}^\infty C_j / \lambda^{j(n-2)}$$

diverges.

The Wiener criterion was first devised by Norbert Wiener; it was extended by Werner Püschel to uniformly elliptic divergence-form equations with smooth coefficients, and thence to uniformly elliptic divergence form equations with bounded measureable coefficients by Walter Littman, Guido Stampacchia, and Hans Weinberger.
