= Argand system =

In mathematics, an nth-order Argand system (named after French mathematician Jean-Robert Argand) is a coordinate system constructed around the nth roots of unity. From the origin, n axes extend such that the angle between each axis and the axes immediately before and after it is 360/n degrees. For example, the number line is the 2nd-order Argand system because the two axes extending from the origin represent 1 and −1, the 2nd roots of unity. The complex plane (sometimes called the Argand plane, also named after Argand) is the 4th-order Argand system because the 4 axes extending from the origin represent 1, i, −1, and −i, the 4th roots of unity.
