= Cohn's irreducibility criterion =

Sufficient condition for a polynomial to be unfactorable

Cohn's irreducibility criterion is a sufficient condition for a polynomial to be irreducible in $\mathbb{Z}[x]$—that is, for it to be unfactorable into the product of lower-degree polynomials with integer coefficients.

== Statement ==
The criterion is often stated as follows:

If a prime number $p$ is expressed in base 10 as $p = a_m 10^m + a_{m-1} 10^{m-1} +\cdots+ a_1 10 + a_0$ (where $0\leq a_i\leq 9$) then the polynomial

$$f(x)=a_mx^m+a_{m-1}x^{m-1}+\cdots+a_1x+a_0$$

is irreducible in $\mathbb{Z}[x]$.

The theorem can be generalized to other bases as follows:

Assume that $b \ge 2$ is a natural number and $p(x) = a_k x^k + a_{k-1} x^{k-1} +\cdots+ a_1 x + a_0$ is a polynomial such that $0\leq a_i \leq b-1$. If $p(b)$ is a prime number then $p(x)$ is irreducible in $\mathbb{Z}[x]$.

== History and extensions ==
The base 10 version of the theorem is attributed to Cohn by Pólya and Szegő in Problems and Theorems in Analysis while the generalization to any base b is due to Brillhart, Filaseta, and Odlyzko. It is clear from context that the "A. Cohn" mentioned by Polya and Szegő is Arthur Cohn (1894–1940), a student of Issai Schur who was awarded his doctorate from Frederick William University in 1921.

A further generalization of the theorem allowing coefficients larger than digits was given by Filaseta and Gross. In particular, let $f(x)$ be a polynomial with non-negative integer coefficients such that $f(10)$ is prime. If all coefficients are $\leq$ 49598666989151226098104244512918, then $f(x)$ is irreducible over $\mathbb{Z}[x]$. Moreover, they proved that this bound is also sharp. In other words, coefficients larger than 49598666989151226098104244512918 do not guarantee irreducibility. The method of Filaseta and Gross was also generalized to provide similar sharp bounds for some other bases by Cole, Dunn, and Filaseta. Analogue results exist in bases other than 10.

An analogue of the theorem also holds for algebraic function fields over finite fields.

== Converse ==
The converse of this criterion is that, if p is an irreducible polynomial with integer coefficients that have greatest common divisor 1, then there exists a base such that the coefficients of p form the representation of a prime number in that base. This is the Bunyakovsky conjecture and its truth or falsity remains an open question.

== See also ==
- Eisenstein's criterion
- Perron's irreducibility criterion
