= Rational root theorem =

Relationship between the rational roots of a polynomial and its extreme coefficients

In algebra, the rational root theorem (or rational root test, rational zero theorem, rational zero test or p/q theorem) states a constraint on rational solutions of a polynomial equation
$$a_nx^n+a_{n-1}x^{n-1}+\cdots+a_0 = 0$$
with integer coefficients $a_i\in\mathbb{Z}$ and $a_0,a_n \neq 0$. Solutions of the equation are also called roots or zeros of the polynomial on the left side.

The theorem states that each rational solution $x=\tfrac pq$ written in lowest terms (that is, p and q are relatively prime), satisfies:

- p is an integer factor of the constant term a_{0}, and
- q is an integer factor of the leading coefficient a_{n}.

The rational root theorem is a special case (for a single linear factor) of Gauss's lemma on the factorization of polynomials. The integral root theorem is the special case of the rational root theorem when the leading coefficient is a_{n} = 1.

== Application ==
The theorem is used to find all rational roots of a polynomial, if any. It gives a finite number of possible fractions which can be checked to see if they are roots. If a rational root x = r is found, a linear polynomial (x – r) can be factored out of the polynomial using polynomial long division, resulting in a polynomial of lower degree whose roots are also roots of the original polynomial.

=== Cubic equation ===
The general cubic equation
$$ax^3 + bx^2 + cx + d = 0$$
with integer coefficients has three solutions in the complex plane. If the rational root test finds no rational solutions, then the only way to express the solutions algebraically uses cube roots. But if the test finds a rational solution r, then factoring out (x – r) leaves a quadratic polynomial whose two roots, found with the quadratic formula, are the remaining two roots of the cubic, avoiding cube roots.

== Proofs ==
=== Elementary proof ===
Let $P(x) \ =\ a_n x^n + a_{n-1} x^{n-1} + \cdots + a_1 x + a_0$ with $a_0, \ldots, a_n \in \mathbb{Z}, a_0,a_n \neq 0.$

Suppose P(p/q) = 0 for some coprime p, q ∈ ℤ:
$$P\left(\tfrac{p}{q}\right) = a_n\left(\tfrac{p}{q}\right)^n + a_{n-1}\left(\tfrac{p}{q}\right)^{n-1} + \cdots + a_1 \left(\tfrac{p}{q}\right) + a_0 = 0.$$

To clear denominators, multiply both sides by q^{n}:
$$a_n p^n + a_{n-1} p^{n-1}q + \cdots + a_1 p q^{n-1} + a_0 q^n = 0.$$

Shifting the a_{0} term to the right side and factoring out p on the left side produces:
$$p \left (a_np^{n-1} + a_{n-1}qp^{n-2} + \cdots + a_1q^{n-1} \right ) = -a_0q^n.$$

Thus, p divides a_{0}q^{n}. But p is coprime to q and therefore to q^{n}, so by Euclid's lemma p must divide the remaining factor a_{0}.

On the other hand, shifting the a_{n} term to the right side and factoring out q on the left side produces:
$$q \left (a_{n-1}p^{n-1} + a_{n-2}qp^{n-2} + \cdots + a_0q^{n-1} \right ) = -a_np^n.$$

Reasoning as before, it follows that q divides a_{n}.

=== Proof using Gauss's lemma ===
Should there be a nontrivial factor dividing all the coefficients of the polynomial, then one can divide by the greatest common divisor of the coefficients so as to obtain a primitive polynomial in the sense of Gauss's lemma; this does not alter the set of rational roots and only strengthens the divisibility conditions. That lemma says that if the polynomial factors in Q[X], then it also factors in Z[X] as a product of primitive polynomials. Now any rational root p/q corresponds to a factor of degree 1 in Q[X] of the polynomial, and its primitive representative is then qx − p, assuming that p and q are coprime. But any multiple in Z[X] of qx − p has leading term divisible by q and constant term divisible by p, which proves the statement. This argument shows that more generally, any irreducible factor of P can be supposed to have integer coefficients, and leading and constant coefficients dividing the corresponding coefficients of P.

== Examples ==
=== First ===
In the polynomial
$$2x^3+x-1,$$
any rational root fully reduced should have a numerator that divides 1 and a denominator that divides 2. Hence, the only possible rational roots are $\pm \tfrac{1}{2}$ and $\pm1$. Since neither of these equates the polynomial to zero, it has no rational roots.

=== Second ===
In the polynomial
$$x^3-7x+6,$$
the only possible rational roots would have a numerator that divides 6 and a denominator that divides 1, limiting the possibilities to ±1, ±2, ±3, and ±6. Of these, 1, 2, and –3 equate the polynomial to zero, and hence are its rational roots (in fact, these are its only roots, since a cubic polynomial has only three roots).

=== Third ===
Every rational root of the polynomial
$$P=3x^3 - 5x^2 + 5x - 2$$
must be one of the 8 numbers
$$\pm 1, \pm2, \pm\tfrac{1}{3}, \pm \tfrac{2}{3} .$$
These 8 possible values for x can be tested by evaluating the polynomial. It turns out there is exactly one rational root, which is $x=2/3.$

However, these eight computations may be rather tedious, and some tricks allow avoiding some of them.

Firstly, if $x<0,$ all terms of P become negative, and their sum cannot be 0; so, every root is positive, and a rational root must be one of the four values $1, 2, \tfrac{1}{3}, \tfrac{2}{3} .$

One has $P(1)=3-5+5-2=1.$ So, 1 is not a root. Moreover, if one sets x = 1 + t, one gets without computation that $Q(t)=P(t+1)$ is a polynomial in t with the same first coefficient 3 and constant term 1. The rational root theorem implies thus that a rational root of Q must belong to $\{\pm1, \pm\frac 13 \},$ and thus that the rational roots of P satisfy $x = 1+t \in \{2, 0, \tfrac{4}{3}, \tfrac{2}{3}\}.$ This shows again that any rational root of P is positive, and the only remaining candidates are 2 and 2/3.

To show that 2 is not a root, it suffices to remark that if $x=2,$ then $3x^3$ and $5x-2$ are multiples of 8, while $-5x^2$ is not. So, their sum cannot be zero.

Finally, only $P(2/3)$ needs to be computed to verify that it is a root of the polynomial.

=== Fourth ===
If $a, b$ and $\tfrac{a^2}{b} +\tfrac{b^2}{a}$ are integers ($a\neq 0, b\neq 0$), then both $\tfrac{a^2}{b}$ and $\tfrac{b^2}{a}$ must be integer.

Consider the quadratic equation whose roots are $\tfrac{a^2}{b}$ and $\tfrac{b^2}{a}$:

$$(x-\tfrac{a^2}{b})(x-\tfrac{b^2}{a})=x^2-(\tfrac{a^2}{b} +\tfrac{b^2}{a})x +\tfrac{a^2}{b}\cdot\tfrac{b^2}{a}.$$

Simplify the coefficients:

- The coefficient of $x$ is $m=-(\tfrac{a^2}{b} +\tfrac{b^2}{a}),$
- The constant term is $n=\tfrac{a^2}{b}\cdot\tfrac{b^2}{a}=ab.$

Thus, the equation becomes:
$$x^2+mx+n=0,$$
where:

- $m=-(\tfrac{a^2}{b} +\tfrac{b^2}{a})$, obviously integer, as negation of an integer,
- $n=ab$, also integer, as the product of two integers.

Apply the rational root theorem:

$a, b$ given to be integers ($a\neq 0, b\neq 0$), i.e. $\tfrac{a^2}{b}$ and $\tfrac{b^2}{a}$ are rational. If $\tfrac{p}{q}$ is a rational root of the equation, then $q$ is an integer factor of the $x^2$ coefficient, i.e. of $1$. Thus, $q=1$. Thus, the rational root is an integer. Thus, $\tfrac{a^2}{b}$ and $\tfrac{b^2}{a}$ are integers.

== See also ==
- Fundamental theorem of algebra
- Integrally closed domain
- Descartes' rule of signs
- Gauss–Lucas theorem
- Properties of polynomial roots
- Content (algebra)
- Eisenstein's criterion
- Polynomial root-finding
