= Monic polynomial =

Polynomial with 1 as leading coefficient

In algebra, a monic polynomial is a non-zero univariate polynomial (that is, a polynomial in a single variable) in which the leading coefficient (the coefficient of the nonzero term of highest degree) is equal to 1. That is to say, a monic polynomial is one that can be written as

$$x^n+c_{n-1}x^{n-1}+\cdots+c_2x^2+c_1x+c_0,$$

with $n \geq 0.$

== Uses ==
Monic polynomials are widely used in algebra and number theory, since they produce many simplifications and they avoid divisions and denominators. Here are some examples.

Every polynomial is associated to a unique monic polynomial. In particular, the unique factorization property of polynomials can be stated as: Every polynomial can be uniquely factorized as the product of its leading coefficient and a product of monic irreducible polynomials.

Vieta's formulas are simpler in the case of monic polynomials: The kth elementary symmetric function of the roots of a monic polynomial of degree n equals $(-1)^kc_{n-k},$ where $c_{n-k}$ is the coefficient of the (n−k)th power of the indeterminate.

Euclidean division of a polynomial by a monic polynomial does not introduce divisions of coefficients. Therefore, it is defined for polynomials with coefficients in a commutative ring.

Algebraic integers are defined as the roots of monic polynomials with integer coefficients.

== Properties ==
Every nonzero univariate polynomial (polynomial with a single indeterminate) can be written

$$c_nx^n + c_{n-1}x^{n-1}+ \cdots c_1x +c_0,$$

where $c_n,\ldots,c_0$ are the coefficients of the polynomial, and the leading coefficient $c_n$ is nonzero. By definition, such a polynomial is monic if $c_n=1.$

The product of monic polynomials is monic. The product of polynomials is monic if and only if the product of the leading coefficients of the factors equals 1.

This implies that the monic polynomials in a univariate polynomial ring over a commutative ring form a monoid under polynomial multiplication.

Two monic polynomials are associated if and only if they are equal, since the multiplication of a polynomial by a nonzero constant produces a polynomial with this constant as its leading coefficient.

Divisibility induces a partial order on monic polynomials. This results almost immediately from the preceding properties.

== Polynomial equations ==
Let $P(x)=0$ be a polynomial equation, where P is a univariate polynomial of degree n. If one divides all coefficients of P by its leading coefficient $c_n,$ one obtains a new polynomial equation that has the same solutions.

For example, the equation

$$2x^2+3x+1 = 0$$

is equivalent to the monic equation

$$x^2+\frac{3}{2}x+\frac{1}{2}=0.$$

When the coefficients are unspecified, or belong to a field where division does not result in fractions (such as $\R, \Complex,$ or a finite field), this reduction to monic equations may provide simplification. On the other hand, as shown by the previous example, when the coefficients are integers, the associated monic polynomial is generally more complicated. Therefore, primitive polynomials are often used instead of monic polynomials when dealing with integer coefficients.

== Integral elements ==
Monic polynomial equations are at the basis of the theory of algebraic integers, and more generally of integral elements.

Let R be a subring of a field F; this implies that R is an integral domain. An element a of F is integral over R if it is a root of a monic polynomial with coefficients in R.

A complex number that is integral over the integers is called an algebraic integer. This terminology is motivated by the fact that the integers are exactly the rational numbers that are also algebraic integers. This results from the rational root theorem, which asserts that, if the rational number $\frac pq$ (in lowest terms) is a root of a polynomial with integer coefficients, then q is a divisor of the leading coefficient; so, if the polynomial is monic, then $q=\pm 1,$ and the number is an integer. Conversely, an integer p is a root of the monic polynomial $x-p.$

It can be proved that, if two elements of a field F are integral over a subring R of F, then the sum and the product of these elements are also integral over R. It follows that the elements of F that are integral over R form a ring, called the integral closure of R in K. An integral domain that equals its integral closure in its field of fractions is called an integrally closed domain.

These concepts are fundamental in algebraic number theory. For example, many of the numerous incorrect proofs of Fermat's Last Theorem that were written over the course of more than three centuries were wrong because the authors incorrectly assumed that the algebraic integers in an algebraic number field have unique factorization.

== Multivariate polynomials ==
Ordinarily, the term monic is not employed for polynomials of several variables. However, a polynomial in several variables may be regarded as a polynomial in one variable with coefficients being polynomials in the other variables. Being monic depends thus on the choice of one "main" variable. For example, the polynomial

$$p(x,y) = 2xy^2+x^2-y^2+3x+5y-8$$

is monic, if considered as a polynomial in x with coefficients that are polynomials in y:

$$p(x,y) = x^2 + (2y^2+3) \, x + (-y^2+5y-8);$$

but it is not monic when considered as a polynomial in y with coefficients that are polynomials in x:

$$p(x,y)=(2x-1)\,y^2+5y +(x^2+3x-8).$$

In the context of Gröbner bases, a monomial order is generally fixed. In this case, a polynomial may be said to be monic if it has 1 as its leading coefficient (in the monomial order).

Under every definition, the product of monic polynomials is monic, and, if the coefficients belong to a field, every polynomial is associated to exactly one monic polynomial.
