= Primitive part and content =

In algebra, the content of a nonzero polynomial with integer coefficients (or, more generally, with coefficients in a unique factorization domain) is the greatest common divisor of its coefficients. The primitive part of such a polynomial is the quotient of the polynomial by its content. Thus a polynomial is the product of its primitive part and its content, and this factorization is unique up to the multiplication of the content by a unit of the ring of the coefficients (and the multiplication of the primitive part by the inverse of the unit).

A polynomial is primitive if its content equals 1. Thus the primitive part of a polynomial is a primitive polynomial.

Gauss's lemma for polynomials states that the product of primitive polynomials (with coefficients in the same unique factorization domain) also is primitive. This implies that the content and the primitive part of the product of two polynomials are, respectively, the product of the contents and the product of the primitive parts.

As the computation of greatest common divisors is generally much easier than polynomial factorization, the first step of a polynomial factorization algorithm is generally the computation of its primitive part–content factorization (see Factorization of polynomials § Primitive part–content factorization). Then the factorization problem is reduced to factorizing separately the content and the primitive part.

Content and primitive part may be generalized to polynomials over the rational numbers, and, more generally, to polynomials over the field of fractions of a unique factorization domain. This makes essentially equivalent the problems of computing greatest common divisors and factorization of polynomials over the integers and of polynomials over the rational numbers.

== Over the integers ==
For a polynomial with integer coefficients, the content may be either the greatest common divisor of the coefficients or its additive inverse. The choice is arbitrary, and may depend on a further convention, which is commonly that the leading coefficient of the primitive part be positive.

For example, the content of $-12x^3+30x-20$ may be either 2 or −2, since 2 is the greatest common divisor of −12, 30, and −20. If one chooses 2 as the content, the primitive part of this polynomial is
$$-6x^3+15x-10 = \frac{-12x^3+30x-20}{2},$$
and thus the primitive-part-content factorization is
$$-12x^3+30x-20 = 2 (-6x^3+15x-10).$$
For aesthetic reasons, one often prefers choosing a negative content, here −2, giving the primitive-part-content factorization
$$-12x^3+30x-20 =-2 (6x^3-15x+10).$$

== Properties ==
In the remainder of this article, we consider polynomials over a unique factorization domain R, which can typically be the ring of integers, or a polynomial ring over a field. In R, greatest common divisors are well defined, and are unique up to multiplication by a unit of R.

The content c(P) of a polynomial P with coefficients in R is the greatest common divisor of its coefficients, and, as such, is defined up to multiplication by a unit. The primitive part pp(P) of P is the quotient P/c(P) of P by its content; it is a polynomial with coefficients in R, which is unique up to multiplication by a unit. If the content is changed by multiplication by a unit u, then the primitive part must be changed by dividing it by the same unit, in order to keep the equality
$$P = c(P) \operatorname{pp}(P),$$
which is called the primitive-part-content factorization of P.

The main properties of the content and the primitive part are results of Gauss's lemma, which asserts that the product of two primitive polynomials is primitive, where a polynomial is primitive if 1 is the greatest common divisor of its coefficients. This implies:

- The content of a product of polynomials is the product of their contents:
  $$c(P_1 P_2) = c(P_1) c(P_2).$$
- The primitive part of a product of polynomials is the product of their primitive parts:
  $$\operatorname{pp}(P_1 P_2) = \operatorname{pp}(P_1) \operatorname{pp}(P_2).$$
- The content of a greatest common divisor of polynomials is the greatest common divisor (in R) of their contents:
  $$c(\operatorname{gcd}(P_1, P_2)) = \operatorname{gcd}(c(P_1), c(P_2)).$$
- The primitive part of a greatest common divisor of polynomials is the greatest common divisor (in R) of their primitive parts:
  $$\operatorname{pp}(\operatorname{gcd}(P_1, P_2)) = \operatorname{gcd}(\operatorname{pp}(P_1), \operatorname{pp}(P_2)).$$
- The complete factorization of a polynomial over R is the product of the factorization (in R) of the content and of the factorization (in the polynomial ring) of the primitive part.

The last property implies that the computation of the primitive-part-content factorization of a polynomial reduces the computation of its complete factorization to the separate factorization of the content and the primitive part. This is generally interesting, because the computation of the prime-part-content factorization involves only greatest common divisor computation in R, which is usually much easier than factorization.

== Over the rationals ==
The primitive-part-content factorization may be extended to polynomials with rational coefficients as follows.

Given a polynomial P with rational coefficients, by rewriting its coefficients with the same common denominator d, one may rewrite P as
$$P=\frac{Q}{d},$$
where Q is a polynomial with integer coefficients. The content of P is the quotient by d of the content of Q, that is
$$c(P)=\frac{c(Q)}{d},$$
and the primitive part of P is the primitive part of Q:
$$\operatorname{pp}(P) = \operatorname{pp}(Q).$$

It is easy to show that this definition does not depend on the choice of the common denominator, and that the primitive-part-content factorization remains valid:
$$P=c(P)\operatorname{pp}(P).$$

This shows that every polynomial over the rationals is associated with a unique primitive polynomial over the integers, and that the Euclidean algorithm allows the computation of this primitive polynomial.

A consequence is that factoring polynomials over the rationals is equivalent to factoring primitive polynomials over the integers. As polynomials with coefficients in a field are more common than polynomials with integer coefficients, it may seem that this equivalence may be used for factoring polynomials with integer coefficients. In fact, the truth is exactly the opposite: every known efficient algorithm for factoring polynomials with rational coefficients uses this equivalence for reducing the problem modulo some prime number p (see Factorization of polynomials).

This equivalence is also used for computing greatest common divisors of polynomials, although the Euclidean algorithm is defined for polynomials with rational coefficients. In fact, in this case, the Euclidean algorithm requires one to compute the reduced form of many fractions, and this makes the Euclidean algorithm less efficient than algorithms which work only with polynomials over the integers (see Polynomial greatest common divisor).

== Over a field of fractions ==
The results of the preceding section remain valid if the ring of integers and the field of rationals are respectively replaced by any unique factorization domain R and its field of fractions K.

This is typically used for factoring multivariate polynomials, and for proving that a polynomial ring over a unique factorization domain is also a unique factorization domain.

=== Unique factorization property of polynomial rings ===
A polynomial ring over a field is a unique factorization domain. The same is true for a polynomial ring over a unique factorization domain. To prove this, it suffices to consider the univariate case, as the general case may be deduced by induction on the number of indeterminates.

The unique factorization property is a direct consequence of Euclid's lemma: If an irreducible element divides a product, then it divides one of the factors. For univariate polynomials over a field, this results from Bézout's identity, which itself results from the Euclidean algorithm.

So, let R be a unique factorization domain, which is not a field, and R[X] the univariate polynomial ring over R. An irreducible element r in R[X] is either an irreducible element in R or an irreducible primitive polynomial.

If r is in R and divides a product $P_1P_2$ of two polynomials, then it divides the content $c(P_1P_2) = c(P_1)c(P_2).$ Thus, by Euclid's lemma in R, it divides one of the contents, and therefore one of the polynomials.

If r is not R, it is a primitive polynomial (because it is irreducible). Then Euclid's lemma in R[X] results immediately from Euclid's lemma in K[X], where K is the field of fractions of R.

=== Factorization of multivariate polynomials ===
For factoring a multivariate polynomial over a field or over the integers, one may consider it as a univariate polynomial with coefficients in a polynomial ring with one less indeterminate. Then the factorization is reduced to factorizing separately the primitive part and the content. As the content has one less indeterminate, it may be factorized by applying the method recursively. For factorizing the primitive part, the standard method consists of substituting integers to the indeterminates of the coefficients in a way that does not change the degree in the remaining variable, factorizing the resulting univariate polynomial, and lifting the result to a factorization of the primitive part.

== See also ==
- Rational root theorem
