= List of abstract algebra topics =

Branch of mathematics that studies algebraic structures

In mathematics, more specifically algebra, abstract algebra or modern algebra is the study of algebraic structures, which are sets with specific operations acting on their elements. Algebraic structures include groups, rings, fields, modules, vector spaces, lattices, and algebras over a field. The term abstract algebra was coined in the early 20th century to distinguish it from older parts of algebra, and more specifically from elementary algebra, the use of variables to represent numbers in computation and reasoning. The abstract perspective on algebra has become so fundamental to advanced mathematics that it is simply called "algebra", while the term "abstract algebra" is seldom used except in pedagogy.

== Basic language ==
Algebraic structures are defined primarily as sets with operations.

- Algebraic structure
  - Subobjects: subgroup, subring, subalgebra, submodule etc.
- Binary operation
  - Closure of an operation
  - Associative property
  - Distributive property
  - Commutative property
- Unary operator
  - Additive inverse, multiplicative inverse, inverse element
    - Identity element
    - Cancellation property
- Finitary operation
  - Arity

Structure preserving maps called homomorphisms are vital in the study of algebraic objects.

- Homomorphisms
  - Kernels and cokernels
  - Image and coimage
  - Epimorphisms and monomorphisms
    - Isomorphisms
      - Isomorphism theorems

There are several basic ways to combine algebraic objects of the same type to produce a third object of the same type. These constructions are used throughout algebra.

- Direct sum
  - Direct limit
- Direct product
  - Inverse limit
- Quotient objects: quotient group, quotient ring, quotient module etc.
- Tensor product

Advanced concepts:

- Category theory
  - Category of groups
    - Category of abelian groups
  - Category of rings
  - Category of modules (over a fixed ring)
    - Morita equivalence, Morita duality
  - Category of vector spaces
- Homological algebra
  - Filtration (algebra)
  - Exact sequence
  - Functor
- Zorn's lemma

== Semigroups and monoids ==
- Semigroup
  - Subsemigroup
  - Free semigroup
  - Green's relations
  - Inverse semigroup (or inversion semigroup, cf. )
  - Krohn–Rhodes theory
  - Semigroup algebra
  - Transformation semigroup
- Monoid
  - Aperiodic monoid
  - Free monoid
  - Monoid (category theory)
  - Monoid factorisation
  - Syntactic monoid

== Group theory ==
=== Structure ===
- Group (mathematics)
  - Lagrange's theorem (group theory)
  - Subgroup
    - Coset
    - Normal subgroup
    - Characteristic subgroup
    - Centralizer and normalizer subgroups
    - Derived group
    - Frattini subgroup
    - Fitting subgroup
  - Classification of finite simple groups
  - Sylow theorems
  - Local analysis

=== Constructions ===
- Free group
  - Presentation of a group
  - Word problem for groups
- Quotient group
  - Extension problem
- Direct sum, direct product
- Semidirect product
  - Wreath product

=== Types ===
- Simple group
- Finite group
- Abelian group
  - Torsion subgroup
  - Free abelian group
  - Finitely generated abelian group
  - Rank of an abelian group
- Cyclic group
  - Locally cyclic group
- Solvable group
  - Composition series
- Nilpotent group
- Divisible group
- Dedekind group, Hamiltonian group

=== Examples ===
- Examples of groups
  - Trivial group
  - Additive group
  - Permutation group
  - Symmetric group
  - Alternating group
  - p-group
  - List of small groups
  - Klein four-group
  - Quaternion group
  - Dihedral group
  - Dicyclic group
  - Automorphism group
  - Point group
  - Circle group
  - Linear group
  - Orthogonal group

=== Applications ===
- Group action
  - Conjugacy class
  - Inner automorphism
  - Conjugate closure
  - Stabilizer subgroup
  - Orbit (group theory)
  - Orbit-stabilizer theorem
  - Cayley's theorem
  - Burnside's lemma
- Burnside's problem
- Loop group
- Fundamental group

== Ring theory ==
=== General ===
- Ring (mathematics)
- Commutative algebra, Commutative ring
- Ring theory, Noncommutative ring
- Algebra over a field
  - Non-associative algebra
- Relatives to rings: Semiring, Nearring, Rig (algebra)

=== Structure ===
- Subring, Subalgebra
  - Center (algebra)
- Ring ideal
  - Principal ideal
  - Ideal quotient
  - Maximal ideal, minimal ideal
  - Primitive ideal, prime ideal, semiprime ideal
  - Radical of an ideal
- Jacobson radical
- Socle of a ring
- unit (ring theory), Idempotent, Nilpotent, Zero divisor
- Characteristic (algebra)
- Ring homomorphism, Algebra homomorphism
  - Ring epimorphism
  - Ring monomorphism
  - Ring isomorphism
    - Skolem–Noether theorem
- Graded algebra
- Morita equivalence
  - Brauer group
- Stable range condition

=== Constructions ===
- Direct sum of rings, Product of rings
- Quotient ring
- Matrix ring
- Endomorphism ring
- Polynomial ring
- Formal power series
- Monoid ring, Group ring
- Localization of a ring
- Tensor algebra
  - Symmetric algebra, Exterior algebra, Clifford algebra
- Free algebra
- Completion (ring theory)

=== Types ===
- Field (mathematics), Division ring, division algebra
- Simple ring, Central simple algebra, Semisimple ring, Semisimple algebra
- Primitive ring, Semiprimitive ring
- Prime ring, Semiprime ring, Reduced ring
- Integral domain, Domain (ring theory)
  - Field of fractions, Integral closure
  - Euclidean domain, Principal ideal domain, Unique factorization domain, Dedekind domain, Prüfer domain
- Von Neumann regular ring
- Quasi-Frobenius ring
- Hereditary ring, Semihereditary ring
- Local ring, Semi-local ring
- Discrete valuation ring
- Regular local ring
- Cohen–Macaulay ring
- Gorenstein ring
- Artinian ring, Noetherian ring
- Perfect ring, semiperfect ring
- Baer ring, Rickart ring
- Lie ring, Lie algebra
  - Ideal (Lie algebra)
- Jordan algebra
- Differential algebra
- Banach algebra

=== Examples ===
- Rational number, Real number, Complex number, Quaternions, Octonions
  - Hurwitz quaternion
- Gaussian integer

=== Theorems and applications ===
- Algebraic geometry
  - Hilbert's Nullstellensatz
- Hilbert's basis theorem
- Hopkins–Levitzki theorem
- Krull's principal ideal theorem
- Levitzky's theorem
- Galois theory
  - Abel–Ruffini theorem
- Wedderburn–Artin theorem
- Jacobson density theorem
- Wedderburn's little theorem
- Lasker–Noether theorem

== Field theory ==
=== Basic concepts ===
- Field (mathematics)
- Subfield (mathematics)
  - Multiplicative group
    - Primitive element (field theory)
- Field extension
  - Algebraic extension
    - Splitting field
    - Algebraically closed field
      - Algebraic element
      - Algebraic closure
  - Separable extension
    - Separable polynomial
  - Normal extension
  - Galois extension
  - Abelian extension
  - Transcendence degree
- Field norm
- Field trace
- Conjugate element (field theory)
- Tensor product of fields

=== Types ===
- Algebraic number field
- Global field
- Local field
- Finite field
- Symmetric function
- Formally real field
- Real closed field

=== Applications ===
- Galois theory
  - Galois group
  - Inverse Galois problem
- Kummer theory

== Module theory ==
=== General ===
- Module (mathematics)
- Bimodule
- Annihilator (ring theory)

=== Structure ===
- Submodule
  - Pure submodule
- Module homomorphism
  - Essential submodule
  - Superfluous submodule
  - Singular submodule
- Socle of a module
- Radical of a module

=== Constructions ===
- Free module
- Quotient module
- Direct sum, Direct product of modules
- Direct limit, Inverse limit
- Localization of a module
- Completion (ring theory)

=== Types ===
- Simple module, Semisimple module
- Indecomposable module
- Artinian module, Noetherian module
- Homological types:
  - Projective module
    - Projective cover
    - Swan's theorem
    - Quillen–Suslin theorem
  - Injective module
    - Injective hull
  - Flat module
    - Flat cover
- Coherent module
- Finitely-generated module
- Finitely-presented module
- Finitely related module
- Algebraically compact module
- Reflexive module

=== Concepts and theorems ===
- Composition series
  - Length of a module
- Structure theorem for finitely generated modules over a principal ideal domain
- Homological dimension
  - Projective dimension
  - Injective dimension
  - Flat dimension
  - Global dimension
  - Weak global dimension
  - Cohomological dimension
- Krull dimension
- Regular sequence (algebra), depth (algebra)
- Fitting lemma
- Schur's lemma
- Nakayama's lemma
- Krull–Schmidt theorem
- Steinitz exchange lemma
- Jordan–Hölder theorem
- Artin–Rees lemma
- Schanuel's lemma
- Morita equivalence
  - Progenerator

== Representation theory ==
Representation theory (& outline)

- Algebra representation
- Group representation
- Lie algebra representation
- Maschke's theorem
- Schur's lemma
- Equivariant map
- Frobenius reciprocity
  - Induced representation
  - Restricted representation
- Affine representation
- Projective representation
- Modular representation theory
- Quiver (mathematics)
- Representation theory of Hopf algebras

== Non-associative systems ==
=== General ===
- Associative property, Associator
- Heap (mathematics)
- Magma (algebra)
  - Loop (algebra), Quasigroup
- Nonassociative ring, Non-associative algebra
  - Universal enveloping algebra
  - Lie algebra (see also list of Lie group topics and list of representation theory topics)
  - Jordan algebra
  - Alternative algebra
  - Power associativity
  - Flexible algebra

=== Examples ===
- Cayley–Dickson construction
  - Octonions
  - Sedenions
  - Trigintaduonions
- Hyperbolic quaternions
- Virasoro algebra

== Generalities ==
- Algebraic structure
- Universal algebra
  - Variety (universal algebra)
  - Congruence relation
  - Free object
  - Generating set (universal algebra)
  - Clone (algebra)
- Kernel of a function
  - Kernel (algebra)
  - Isomorphism class
  - Isomorphism theorem
  - Fundamental theorem on homomorphisms
- Universal property
- Filtration (mathematics)
- Category theory
  - Monoidal category
  - Groupoid
  - Group object
  - Coalgebra
  - Bialgebra
  - Hopf algebra
  - Magma object
- Torsion (algebra)

== Computer algebra ==
- Symbolic mathematics
  - Finite field arithmetic
  - Gröbner basis
  - Buchberger's algorithm

== See also ==
- List of commutative algebra topics
- List of homological algebra topics
- List of linear algebra topics
- List of algebraic structures
- Glossary of field theory
- Glossary of group theory
- Glossary of ring theory
- Glossary of tensor theory
