= List of commutative algebra topics =

Commutative algebra, first known as ideal theory, is the branch of algebra that studies commutative rings, their ideals, and modules over such rings. Both algebraic geometry and algebraic number theory build on commutative algebra. Prominent examples of commutative rings include polynomial rings; rings of algebraic integers, including the ordinary integers $\mathbb{Z}$; and p-adic integers.

Commutative algebra is the main technical tool of algebraic geometry, and many results and concepts of commutative algebra are strongly related with geometrical concepts.

== Research fields ==
- Combinatorial commutative algebra
- Invariant theory

=== Active research areas ===
- Serre's multiplicity conjectures
- Homological conjectures

== Basic notions ==
- Commutative ring
- Module (mathematics)
- Ring ideal, maximal ideal, prime ideal
- Ring homomorphism
  - Ring monomorphism
  - Ring epimorphism
  - Ring isomorphism
- Zero divisor
- Chinese remainder theorem

== Classes of rings ==
- Field (mathematics)
- Algebraic number field
- Polynomial ring
- Integral domain
- Boolean algebra (structure)
- Principal ideal domain
- Euclidean domain
- Unique factorization domain
- Dedekind domain
- Nilpotent elements and reduced rings
- Dual numbers
- Tensor product of fields
- Tensor product of R-algebras

== Constructions with commutative rings ==
- Quotient ring
- Field of fractions
- Product of rings
- Annihilator (ring theory)
- Integral closure

== Localization and completion ==
- Completion (ring theory)
- Formal power series
- Localization of a ring
  - Local ring
- Regular local ring
- Localization of a module
- Valuation (mathematics)
  - Discrete valuation
  - Discrete valuation ring
- I-adic topology
- Weierstrass preparation theorem

== Finiteness properties ==
- Noetherian ring
- Hilbert's basis theorem
- Artinian ring
- Ascending chain condition (ACC) and descending chain condition (DCC)

== Ideal theory ==
- Fractional ideal
- Ideal class group
- Radical of an ideal
- Hilbert's Nullstellensatz

== Homological properties ==
- Flat module
- Flat map
- Flat map (ring theory)
- Projective module
- Injective module
- Cohen-Macaulay ring
- Gorenstein ring
- Complete intersection ring
- Koszul complex
- Hilbert's syzygy theorem
- Quillen–Suslin theorem

== Dimension theory ==
- Height (ring theory)
- Depth (ring theory)
- Hilbert polynomial
- Regular local ring
  - Discrete valuation ring
- Global dimension
- Regular sequence (algebra)
- Krull dimension
- Krull's principal ideal theorem

== Ring extensions, primary decomposition ==
- Primary ideal
- Primary decomposition and the Lasker–Noether theorem
- Noether normalization lemma
- Going up and going down

== Relation with algebraic geometry ==
- Spectrum of a ring
- Zariski tangent space
- Kähler differential

== Computational and algorithmic aspects ==
- Elimination theory
- Gröbner basis
- Buchberger's algorithm

== Related disciplines ==
- Algebraic number theory
- Algebraic geometry
- Ring theory
- Field theory (mathematics)
- Differential algebra
- Homological algebra
