= Auslander algebra =

In mathematics, the Auslander algebra of an algebra A is the endomorphism ring of the sum of the indecomposable modules of A. It was introduced by Auslander (1974).

An Artin algebra Γ is called an Auslander algebra if gl dim Γ ≤ 2 and if 0 → Γ → I → J → K → 0 is a minimal injective resolution of Γ then I and J are projective Γ-modules.
