= Idun Reiten =

Norwegian mathematician (1942–2025)

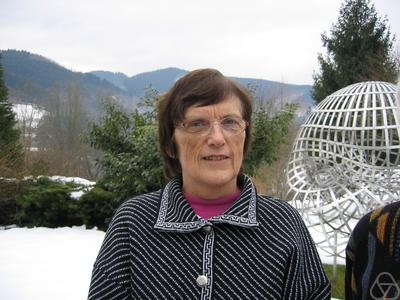
- Reiten at Oberwolfach in 2005
- Born: 1 January 1942; Klæbu, Norway
- Died: 19 August 2025 (aged 83); Trondheim, Norway
- Education: University of Illinois
- Awards: Commander, Order of St. Olav; Nansen Medal for Outstanding Research; Humboldt Research Award
- Scientific career
- Fields: Mathematics
- Workplaces: University of Trondheim
- Thesis: Trivial Extensions and Gorenstein Rings (1971)

Idun Reiten (1 January 1942 – 19 August 2025) was a Norwegian professor of mathematics. She was considered to be one of Norway's greatest mathematicians during her lifetime. With national and international honors and recognition, she had supervised 11 students and had 28 academic descendants as of March 2024. She was an expert in representation theory, and is known for work in tilting theory and Artin algebras.

== Life and career ==
Reiten took her PhD degree at the University of Illinois in 1971, becoming the second Norwegian woman to earn a PhD in mathematics; the first was Elizabeth Stephansen in 1902. She was appointed a professor at the University of Trondheim in 1982, now named the Norwegian University of Science and Technology.

Her research area was representation theory for Artinian algebras, commutative algebra, and homological algebra. Her work with Maurice Auslander now forms the part of the study of Artinian algebras known as Auslander–Reiten theory. This theory utilizes such concepts as almost-split sequences and Auslander-Reiten quivers, which were developed in a series of papers. She died on 19 August 2025, at the age of 83.

== Awards and honours ==
In 2005, Reiten received the Humboldt Research Award. In 2007, Reiten was awarded the Möbius prize. In 2009 she was awarded Fridtjof Nansen's award for successful researchers, (in the field of mathematics and the natural sciences), and the Nansen Medal for Outstanding Research.

In 2007, she was elected a foreign member of the Royal Swedish Academy of Sciences. She was also a member of the Norwegian Academy of Science and Letters, the Royal Norwegian Society of Sciences and Letters, and Academia Europaea.

In 2012, she became a fellow of the American Mathematical Society. She was named MSRI Clay Senior Scholar and Simons Professor for 2012-13.

She delivered the Emmy Noether Lecture at the International Congress of Mathematicians (ICM) in 2010 in Hyderabad and was an Invited Speaker at the ICM in 1998 in Berlin.

In 2014, the Norwegian King appointed Reiten as commander of the Order of St. Olav "for her work as a mathematician".

She is the namesake of the IDUN: From PhD to Professor program at the Norwegian University of Science and Technology Faculty of Information Technology and Electrical Engineering, which aimed at "increasing the number of female scientists in top positions at NTNU's Faculty of Computer Science and Electrical Engineering."

== See also ==
- Krull–Schmidt category

Awards
| Preceded by Trond Berg | Recipient of the Fridtjof Nansen Outstanding Research Award in Science; 2009 | Succeeded by Bjørn Jamtveit |
