= Tilting theory =

Topic in abstract algebra

It turns out that there are applications of our functors which make use of the analogous transformations which we like to think of as a change of basis for a fixed root-system — a tilting of the axes relative to the roots which results in a different subset of roots lying in the positive cone. ... For this reason, and because the word 'tilt' inflects easily, we call our functors tilting functors or simply tilts.

— Brenner & Butler (1980, p. 103)

In mathematics, specifically representation theory, tilting theory describes a way to relate the module categories of two algebras using so-called tilting modules and associated tilting functors. Here, the second algebra is the endomorphism algebra of a tilting module over the first algebra.

Tilting theory was motivated by the introduction of reflection functors by Joseph Bernšteĭn, Israel Gelfand, and V. A. Ponomarev (1973); these functors were used to relate representations of two quivers. These functors were reformulated by Maurice Auslander, María Inés Platzeck, and Idun Reiten (1979), and generalized by Sheila Brenner and Michael C. R. Butler (1980) who introduced tilting functors. Dieter Happel and Claus Michael Ringel (1982) defined tilted algebras and tilting modules as further generalizations of this.

== Definitions ==
Suppose that A is a finite-dimensional unital associative algebra over some field. A finitely-generated right A-module T is called a tilting module if it has the following three properties:

- T has projective dimension at most 1, in other words it is a quotient of a projective module by a projective submodule.
- Ext^{1}_{A}(T,T ) = 0.
- The right A-module A is the kernel of a surjective morphism between finite direct sums of direct summands of T.

Given such a tilting module, we define the endomorphism algebra B = End_{A}(T ). This is another finite-dimensional algebra, and T is a finitely-generated left B-module. The tilting functors Hom_{A}(T,−), Ext^{1}_{A}(T,−), −⊗_{B}T and Tor^{B}_{1}(−,T) relate the category mod-A of finitely-generated right A-modules to the category mod-B of finitely-generated right B-modules.

In practice one often considers hereditary finite-dimensional algebras A because the module categories over such algebras are fairly well understood. The endomorphism algebra of a tilting module over a hereditary finite-dimensional algebra is called a tilted algebra.

== Facts ==
Suppose A is a finite-dimensional algebra, T is a tilting module over A, and B = End_{A}(T ). Write F = Hom_{A}(T,−), F′ = Ext^{1}_{A}(T,−), G = −⊗_{B}T, and G′ = Tor^{B}_{1}(−,T). F is right adjoint to G and F′ is right adjoint to G′.

Brenner & Butler (1980) showed that tilting functors give equivalences between certain subcategories of mod-A and mod-B. Specifically, if we define the two subcategories $\mathcal{F}=\ker(F)$ and $\mathcal{T}=\ker(F')$ of A-mod, and the two subcategories $\mathcal{X}=\ker(G)$ and $\mathcal{Y}=\ker(G')$ of B-mod, then $(\mathcal{T},\mathcal{F})$ is a torsion pair in A-mod (i.e. $\mathcal{T}$ and $\mathcal{F}$ are maximal subcategories with the property $\operatorname{Hom}(\mathcal{T},\mathcal{F})=0$; this implies that every M in A-mod admits a natural short exact sequence $0 \to U \to M \to V \to 0$ with U in $\mathcal{T}$ and V in $\mathcal{F}$) and $(\mathcal{X},\mathcal{Y})$ is a torsion pair in B-mod. Further, the restrictions of the functors F and G yield inverse equivalences between $\mathcal{T}$ and $\mathcal{Y}$, while the restrictions of F′ and G′ yield inverse equivalences between $\mathcal{F}$ and $\mathcal{X}$. (Note that these equivalences switch the order of the torsion pairs $(\mathcal{T},\mathcal{F})$ and $(\mathcal{X},\mathcal{Y})$.)

Tilting theory may be seen as a generalization of Morita equivalence which is recovered if T is a projective generator; in that case $\mathcal{T}=\operatorname{mod}-A$ and $\mathcal{Y}=\operatorname{mod}-B$.

If A has finite global dimension, then B also has finite global dimension, and the difference of F and F' induces an isometry between the Grothendieck groups K_{0}(A) and K_{0}(B).

In case A is hereditary (i.e. B is a tilted algebra), the global dimension of B is at most 2, and the torsion pair $(\mathcal{X},\mathcal{Y})$ splits, i.e. every indecomposable object of B-mod is either in $\mathcal{X}$ or in $\mathcal{Y}$.

Happel (1988) and Cline, Parshall & Scott (1986) showed that in general A and B are derived equivalent (i.e. the derived categories D^{b}(A-mod) and D^{b}(B-mod) are equivalent as triangulated categories).

== Generalizations and extensions ==
A generalized tilting module over the finite-dimensional algebra A is a right A-module T with the following three properties:

- T has finite projective dimension.
- Ext^{i}_{A}(T,T) = 0 for all i > 0.
- There is an exact sequence $0 \to A \to T_1 \to\dots\to T_n \to 0$ where the T_{i} are finite direct sums of direct summands of T.

These generalized tilting modules also yield derived equivalences between A and B, where B = End_{A}(T ).

Rickard (1989) extended the results on derived equivalence by proving that two finite-dimensional algebras R and S are derived equivalent if and only if S is the endomorphism algebra of a "tilting complex" over R. Tilting complexes are generalizations of generalized tilting modules. A version of this theorem is valid for arbitrary rings R and S.

Happel, Reiten & Smalø (1996) defined tilting objects in hereditary abelian categories in which all Hom- and Ext-spaces are finite-dimensional over some algebraically closed field k. The endomorphism algebras of these tilting objects are the quasi-tilted algebras, a generalization of tilted algebras. The quasi-tilted algebras over k are precisely the finite-dimensional algebras over k of global dimension ≤ 2 such that every indecomposable module either has projective dimension ≤ 1 or injective dimension ≤ 1. Happel (2001) classified the hereditary abelian categories that can appear in the above construction.

Colpi & Fuller (2007) defined tilting objects T in an arbitrary abelian category C; their definition requires that C contain the direct sums of arbitrary (possibly infinite) numbers of copies of T, so this is not a direct generalization of the finite-dimensional situation considered above. Given such a tilting object with endomorphism ring R, they establish tilting functors that provide equivalences between a torsion pair in C and a torsion pair in R-Mod, the category of all R-modules.

From the theory of cluster algebras came the definition of cluster category (from Buan et al. (2006)) and cluster tilted algebra (Buan, Marsh & Reiten (2007)) associated to a hereditary algebra A. A cluster tilted algebra arises from a tilted algebra as a certain semidirect product, and the cluster category of A summarizes all the module categories of cluster tilted algebras arising from A.
