= Linear relation =

Type of mathematical equation

In linear algebra, a linear relation, or simply relation, between elements of a vector space or a module is a linear equation that has these elements as a solution.

More precisely, if $e_1,\dots,e_n$ are elements of a (left) module M over a ring R (the case of a vector space over a field is a special case), a relation between $e_1,\dots,e_n$ is a sequence $(f_1,\dots, f_n)$ of elements of R such that

$$f_1e_1+\dots+f_ne_n=0.$$

The relations between $e_1,\dots,e_n$ form a module. One is generally interested in the case where $e_1,\dots,e_n$ is a generating set of a finitely generated module M, in which case the module of the relations is often called a syzygy module of M. The syzygy module depends on the choice of a generating set, but it is unique up to the direct sum with a free module. That is, if $S_1$ and $S_2$ are syzygy modules corresponding to two generating sets of the same module, then they are stably isomorphic, which means that there exist two free modules $L_1$ and $L_2$ such that $S_1\oplus L_1$ and $S_2\oplus L_2$ are isomorphic.

Higher order syzygy modules are defined recursively: a first syzygy module of a module M is simply its syzygy module. For k > 1, a kth syzygy module of M is a syzygy module of a (k – 1)-th syzygy module. Hilbert's syzygy theorem states that, if $R=K[x_1,\dots,x_n]$ is a polynomial ring in n indeterminates over a field, then every nth syzygy module is free. The case n = 0 is the fact that every finite dimensional vector space has a basis, and the case n = 1 is the fact that K[x] is a principal ideal domain and that every submodule of a finitely generated free K[x] module is also free.

The construction of higher order syzygy modules is generalized as the definition of free resolutions, which allows restating Hilbert's syzygy theorem as a polynomial ring in n indeterminates over a field has global homological dimension n.

If a and b are two elements of the commutative ring R, then (b, –a) is a relation that is said trivial. The module of trivial relations of an ideal is the submodule of the first syzygy module of the ideal that is generated by the trivial relations between the elements of a generating set of an ideal. The concept of trivial relations can be generalized to higher order syzygy modules, and this leads to the concept of the Koszul complex of an ideal, which provides information on the non-trivial relations between the generators of an ideal.

== Basic definitions ==
Let R be a ring, and M be a left R-module. A linear relation, or simply a relation between k elements $x_1, \dots, x_k$ of M is a sequence $(a_1, \dots, a_k)$ of elements of R such that

$$a_1x_1+\dots+ a_kx_k=0.$$

If $x_1, \dots, x_k$ is a generating set of M, the relation is often called a syzygy of M. It makes sense to call it a syzygy of $M$ without regard to $x_1,..,x_k$ because, although the syzygy module depends on the chosen generating set, most of its properties are independent; see § Stable properties, below.

If the ring R is Noetherian, or, at least coherent, and if M is finitely generated, then the syzygy module is also finitely generated. A syzygy module of this syzygy module is a second syzygy module of M. Continuing this way one can define a kth syzygy module for every positive integer k.

Hilbert's syzygy theorem asserts that, if M is a finitely generated module over a polynomial ring $K[x_1, \dots, x_n]$ over a field, then any nth syzygy module is a free module.

== Stable properties ==
Generally speaking, in the language of K-theory, a property is stable if it becomes true by making a direct sum with a sufficiently large free module. A fundamental property of syzygies modules is that there are "stably independent" of choices of generating sets for involved modules. The following result is the basis of these stable properties.

Proposition—Let $\{x_1,\dots, x_m\}$ be a generating set of an R-module M, and $y_1, \dots, y_n$ be other elements of M. The module of the relations between $x_1,\dots, x_m, y_1,\dots, y_n$ is the direct sum of the module of the relations between $x_1,\dots, x_m,$ and a free module of rank n.

Proof. As $\{x_1,\dots, x_m\}$ is a generating set, each $y_i$ can be written $\textstyle y_i=\sum \alpha_{i,j}x_j.$ This provides a relation $r_i$ between $x_1,\dots, x_m, y_1,\dots, y_n.$ Now, if $r=(a_1, \dots,a_m, b_1,\dots,b_n)$ is any relation, then $\textstyle r-\sum b_ir_i$ is a relation between the $x_1,\dots, x_m$ only. In other words, every relation between $x_1,\dots, x_m, y_1,\dots, y_n$ is a sum of a relation between $x_1,\dots, x_m,$ and a linear combination of the $r_i$s. It is straightforward to prove that this decomposition is unique, and this proves the result. $\blacksquare$

This proves that the first syzygy module is "stably unique". More precisely, given two generating sets $S_1$ and $S_2$ of a module M, if $S_1$ and $S_2$ are the corresponding modules of relations, then there exist two free modules $L_1$ and $L_2$ such that $S_1\oplus L_1$ and $S_2\oplus L_2$ are isomorphic. For proving this, it suffices to apply twice the preceding proposition for getting two decompositions of the module of the relations between the union of the two generating sets.

For obtaining a similar result for higher syzygy modules, it remains to prove that, if M is any module, and L is a free module, then M and M ⊕ L have isomorphic syzygy modules. It suffices to consider a generating set of M ⊕ L that consists of a generating set of M and a basis of L. For every relation between the elements of this generating set, the coefficients of the basis elements of L are all zero, and the syzygies of M ⊕ L are exactly the syzygies of M extended with zero coefficients. This completes the proof to the following theorem.

Theorem—For every positive integer k, the kth syzygy module of a given module depends on choices of generating sets, but is unique up to the direct sum with a free module. More precisely, if $S_1$ and $S_2$ are kth syzygy modules that are obtained by different choices of generating sets, then there are free modules $L_1$ and $L_2$ such that $S_1\oplus L_1$ and $S_2\oplus L_2$ are isomorphic.

== Relationship with free resolutions ==
Given a generating set $g_1,\dots,g_n$ of an R-module, one can consider a free module L of basis $G_1,\dots,G_n,$ where $G_1,\dots,G_n$ are new indeterminates. This defines an exact sequence

$$L\longrightarrow M \longrightarrow 0,$$

where the left arrow is the linear map that maps each $G_i$ to the corresponding $g_i.$ The kernel of this left arrow is a first syzygy module of M.

One can repeat this construction with this kernel in place of M. Repeating again and again this construction, one gets a long exact sequence

$$\cdots\longrightarrow L_k\longrightarrow L_{k-1} \longrightarrow \cdots\longrightarrow L_0 \longrightarrow M \longrightarrow 0,$$

where all $L_i$ are free modules. By definition, such a long exact sequence is a free resolution of M.

For every k ≥ 1, the kernel $S_k$ of the arrow starting from $L_{k-1}$ is a kth syzygy module of M. It follows that the study of free resolutions is the same as the study of syzygy modules.

A free resolution is finite of length ≤ n if $S_n$ is free. In this case, one can take $L_n = S_n,$ and $L_k = 0$ (the zero module) for every k > n.

This allows restating Hilbert's syzygy theorem: If $R=K[x_1, \dots, x_n]$ is a polynomial ring in n indeterminates over a field K, then every free resolution is finite of length at most n.

The global dimension of a commutative Noetherian ring is either infinite, or the minimal n such that every free resolution is finite of length at most n. A commutative Noetherian ring is regular if its global dimension is finite. In this case, the global dimension equals its Krull dimension. So, Hilbert's syzygy theorem may be restated in a very short sentence that hides much mathematics: A polynomial ring over a field is a regular ring.

== Trivial relations ==
In a commutative ring R, one has always ab – ba = 0. This implies trivially that (b, –a) is a linear relation between a and b. Therefore, given a generating set $g_1, \dots,g_k$ of an ideal I, one calls trivial relation or trivial syzygy every element of the submodule the syzygy module that is generated by these trivial relations between two generating elements. More precisely, the module of trivial syzygies is generated by the relations

$$r_{i,j}= (x_1,\dots,x_r)$$

such that $x_i=g_j,$ $x_j=-g_i,$ and $x_h=0$ otherwise.

== History ==
The word syzygy came into mathematics with the work of Arthur Cayley. In that paper, Cayley used it in the theory of resultants and discriminants. As the word syzygy was used in astronomy to denote a linear relation between planets, Cayley used it to denote linear relations between minors of a matrix, such as, in the case of a 2×3 matrix:

$$a\,\begin{vmatrix}b&c\\e&f\end{vmatrix} - b\,\begin{vmatrix}a&c\\d&f\end{vmatrix} +c\,\begin{vmatrix}a&b\\d&e\end{vmatrix}=0.$$

A particular question he studied concerns a set of equations that arise in Plücker embedding, which is an embedding of the (Grassmannian) space of planes $G(2, \R^n)$ into the projective space $\mathbb P(\wedge^2 V)$. Using Plücker coordinates, the space $\mathbb P(\wedge^2 V)$ can be written as $\{[p_{1,2}, p_{1,3}, \dots, p_{n-1, n}]\}$, which has $\tfrac 12 n(n-1)-1$ dimensions. Now, since $G(2, \R^n)$ has $2(n-2)$ dimensions, it should be possible to write it as the intersection of $\tfrac 12 (n-2)(n-3)$ hypersurfaces. However, they found that $G(2, \R^n)$ is the intersection of the $\tfrac 14 n(n-1)(n-2)(n-3)$ equations:
$$Q_{ijkl} := p_{i j} p_{k l}-p_{i k} p_{j l}+p_{i l} p_{j k}=0 \quad(1 \leq i<j<k<l \leq n)$$
Thus, these equations must be dependent on each other when $n \geq 5$. For example, when $n = 5$, the space $G(2, \R^5)$ is a codimension-3 subspace of $\mathbb P(\wedge^2 \R^5)$ defined as the intersection of 5 equations, so there are 2 redundancies, which can be exhibited by the matrix equation:
$$\begin{pmatrix}
0 & p_{12} & p_{13} & p_{14} & p_{15}\\
-p_{12} & 0 & p_{23} & p_{24} & p_{25}\\
-p_{13} & -p_{23} & 0 & p_{34} & p_{35}\\
-p_{14} & -p_{24} & -p_{34} & 0 & p_{45}\\
-p_{15} & -p_{25} & -p_{35} & -p_{45} & 0
\end{pmatrix}
\begin{pmatrix}
Q_1\\ Q_2\\ Q_3\\ Q_4\\ Q_5
\end{pmatrix}
=0, \quad \begin{aligned}
Q_1 & =p_{23} p_{45}-p_{24} p_{35}+p_{25} p_{34} \\
Q_2 & =p_{13} p_{45}-p_{14} p_{35}+p_{15} p_{34} \\
Q_3 & =p_{12} p_{45}-p_{14} p_{25}+p_{15} p_{24} \\
Q_4 & =p_{12} p_{35}-p_{13} p_{25}+p_{15} p_{23} \\
Q_5 & =p_{12} p_{34}-p_{13} p_{24}+p_{14} p_{23} .
\end{aligned}$$
In the subspace of $\mathbb A^9 \subset \mathbb P(\wedge^2 \R^5)$ where $p_{12} = 1$, the two linear syzygies
$$Q_1=p_{23} Q_3+p_{24} Q_4+p_{25} Q_5, \quad Q_2=-p_{13} Q_3-p_{14} Q_4-p_{15} Q_5$$
show that if $Q_3, Q_4, Q_5 = 0$, then the other two conditions are automatically satisfied. This is the redundancy.

Then, the word syzygy was popularized (among mathematicians) by David Hilbert in his 1890 article, which contains three fundamental theorems on polynomials, Hilbert's syzygy theorem, Hilbert's basis theorem and Hilbert's Nullstellensatz.

In his article, Cayley makes use, in a special case, of what was later called the Koszul complex, after a similar construction in differential geometry by the mathematician Jean-Louis Koszul.
