= Hilbert's syzygy theorem =

On polynomial rings over fields

In mathematics, Hilbert's syzygy theorem is one of the three fundamental theorems about polynomial rings over fields, first proved by David Hilbert in 1890, that were introduced for solving important open questions in invariant theory, and are at the basis of modern algebraic geometry. The two other theorems are Hilbert's basis theorem, which asserts that all ideals of polynomial rings over a field are finitely generated, and Hilbert's Nullstellensatz, which establishes a bijective correspondence between affine algebraic varieties and prime ideals of polynomial rings.

Hilbert's syzygy theorem concerns the relations, or syzygies in Hilbert's terminology, between the generators of an ideal, or, more generally, a module. As the relations form a module, one may consider the relations between the relations; the theorem asserts that, if one continues in this way, starting with a module over a polynomial ring in n indeterminates over a field, one eventually finds a zero module of relations, after at most n steps.

Hilbert's syzygy theorem is now considered to be an early result of homological algebra. It is the starting point of the use of homological methods in commutative algebra and algebraic geometry.

== History ==
The syzygy theorem first appeared in Hilbert's seminal paper "Über die Theorie der algebraischen Formen" (1890). The paper is split into five parts: part I proves Hilbert's basis theorem over a field, while part II proves it over the integers. Part III contains the syzygy theorem (Theorem III), which is used in part IV to discuss the Hilbert polynomial. The last part, part V, proves finite generation of certain rings of invariants. Incidentally part III also contains a special case of the Hilbert–Burch theorem.

== Syzygies (relations) ==
Originally, Hilbert defined syzygies for ideals in polynomial rings, but the concept generalizes trivially to (left) modules over any ring.

Given a generating set $g_1, \ldots, g_k$ of a module M over a ring R, a relation or first syzygy between the generators is a k-tuple $(a_1, \ldots, a_k)$ of elements of R such that

$$a_1g_1 + \cdots + a_kg_k =0.$$

Let $L_0$ be a free module with basis $(G_1, \ldots, G_k).$ The k-tuple $(a_1, \ldots, a_k)$ may be identified with the element

$$a_1G_1 + \cdots + a_kG_k,$$

and the relations form the kernel $R_1$ of the linear map $L_0 \to M$ defined by $G_i \mapsto g_i.$ In other words, one has an exact sequence

$$0 \to R_1 \to L_0 \to M \to 0.$$

This first syzygy module $R_1$ depends on the choice of a generating set, but, if $S_1$ is the module that is obtained with another generating set, there exist two free modules $F_1$ and $F_2$ such that

$$R_1 \oplus F_1 \cong S_1 \oplus F_2$$

where $\oplus$ denote the direct sum of modules.

The second syzygy module is the module of the relations between generators of the first syzygy module. By continuing in this way, one may define the kth syzygy module for every positive integer k.

If the kth syzygy module is free for some k, then by taking a basis as a generating set, the next syzygy module (and every subsequent one) is the zero module. If one does not take a basis as a generating set, then all subsequent syzygy modules are free.

Let n be the smallest integer, if any, such that the nth syzygy module of a module M is free or projective. The above property of invariance, up to the sum direct with free modules, implies that n does not depend on the choice of generating sets. The projective dimension of M is this integer, if it exists, or ∞ if not. This is equivalent with the existence of an exact sequence

$$0 \longrightarrow R_n \longrightarrow L_{n-1} \longrightarrow \cdots \longrightarrow L_0 \longrightarrow M \longrightarrow 0,$$

where the modules $L_i$ are free and $R_n$ is projective. It can be shown that one may always choose the generating sets for $R_n$ being free, that is for the above exact sequence to be a free resolution.

== Statement ==
Hilbert's syzygy theorem states that, if M is a finitely generated module over a polynomial ring $k[x_1,\ldots,x_n]$ in n indeterminates over a field k, then the nth syzygy module of M is always a free module.

In modern language, this implies that the projective dimension of M is at most n, and thus that there exists a free resolution

$$0 \longrightarrow L_k \longrightarrow L_{k-1} \longrightarrow \cdots \longrightarrow L_0 \longrightarrow M \longrightarrow 0$$

of length k ≤ n.

This upper bound on the projective dimension is sharp, that is, there are modules of projective dimension exactly n. The standard example is the field k, which may be considered as a $k[x_1,\ldots,x_n]$-module by setting $x_i c=0$ for every i and every c ∈ k. For this module, the nth syzygy module is free, but not the (n − 1)th one (for a proof, see § Koszul complex, below).

The theorem is also true for modules that are not finitely generated. As the global dimension of a ring is the supremum of the projective dimensions of all modules, Hilbert's syzygy theorem may be restated as: the global dimension of $k[x_1,\ldots,x_n]$ is n.

=== Low dimension ===
In the case of zero indeterminates, Hilbert's syzygy theorem is simply the fact that every finitely generated vector space has a basis.

In the case of a single indeterminate, Hilbert's syzygy theorem is an instance of the theorem asserting that over a principal ideal ring, every submodule of a free module is itself free.

== Koszul complex ==
The Koszul complex, also called "complex of exterior algebra", allows, in some cases, an explicit description of all syzygy modules.

Let $g_1, \ldots, g_k$ be a generating system of an ideal I in a polynomial ring $R=k[x_1,\ldots,x_n]$, and let $L_1$ be a free module of basis $G_1, \ldots, G_k.$ The exterior algebra of $L_1$ is the direct sum

$$\Lambda(L_1)=\bigoplus_{t=0}^k L_t,$$

where $L_t$ is the free module, which has, as a basis, the exterior products

$$G_{i_1} \wedge \cdots \wedge G_{i_t},$$

such that $i_1< i_2<\cdots <i_t.$ In particular, one has $L_0=R$ (because of the definition of the empty product), the two definitions of $L_1$ coincide, and $L_t=0$ for t > k. For every positive t, one may define a linear map $L_t\to L_{t-1}$ by

$$G_{i_1} \wedge \cdots \wedge G_{i_t} \mapsto \sum_{j=1}^t (-1)^{j+1}g_{i_j}G_{i_1}\wedge \cdots\wedge \widehat{G}_{i_j} \wedge \cdots\wedge G_{i_t},$$

where the hat means that the factor is omitted. A straightforward computation shows that the composition of two consecutive such maps is zero, and thus that one has a complex

$$0\to L_t \to L_{t-1} \to \cdots \to L_1 \to L_0 \to R/I.$$

This is the Koszul complex. In general the Koszul complex is not an exact sequence, but it is an exact sequence if one works with a polynomial ring $R=k[x_1,\ldots,x_n]$ and an ideal generated by a regular sequence of homogeneous polynomials.

In particular, the sequence $x_1,\ldots,x_n$ is regular, and the Koszul complex is thus a projective resolution of $k=R/\langle x_1, \ldots, x_n\rangle.$ In this case, the nth syzygy module is free of dimension one (generated by the product of all $G_i$); the (n − 1)th syzygy module is thus the quotient of a free module of dimension n by the submodule generated by $(x_1, -x_2, \ldots, \pm x_n).$ This quotient may not be a projective module, as otherwise, there would exist polynomials $p_i$ such that $p_1x_1 + \cdots +p_nx_n=1,$ which is impossible (substituting 0 for the $x_i$ in the latter equality provides 1 = 0). This proves that the projective dimension of $k=R/\langle x_1, \ldots, x_n\rangle$ is exactly n.

The same proof applies for proving that the projective dimension of $k[x_1, \ldots, x_n]/\langle g_1, \ldots, g_t\rangle$ is exactly t if the $g_i$ form a regular sequence of homogeneous polynomials.

== Computation ==
At Hilbert's time, there was no method available for computing syzygies. It was only known that an algorithm may be deduced from any upper bound of the degree of the generators of the module of syzygies. In fact, the coefficients of the syzygies are unknown polynomials. If the degree of these polynomials is bounded, the number of their monomials is also bounded. Expressing that one has a syzygy provides a system of linear equations whose unknowns are the coefficients of these monomials. Therefore, any algorithm for linear systems implies an algorithm for syzygies, as soon as a bound of the degrees is known.

The first bound for syzygies (as well as for the ideal membership problem) was given in 1926 by Grete Hermann: Let M a submodule of a free module L of dimension t over $k[x_1, \ldots, x_n];$ if the coefficients over a basis of L of a generating system of M have a total degree at most d, then there is a constant c such that the degrees occurring in a generating system of the first syzygy module is at most $(td)^{2^{cn}}.$ The same bound applies for testing the membership to M of an element of L.

On the other hand, there are examples where a double exponential degree necessarily occurs. However such examples are extremely rare, and this sets the question of an algorithm that is efficient when the output is not too large. At the present time, the best algorithms for computing syzygies are Gröbner basis algorithms. They allow the computation of the first syzygy module, and also, with almost no extra cost, all syzygies modules.

== Syzygies and regularity ==
One might wonder which ring-theoretic property of $A=k[x_1,\ldots,x_n]$ causes the Hilbert syzygy theorem to hold. It turns out that this is regularity, which is an algebraic formulation of the fact that affine n-space is a variety without singularities. In fact the following generalization holds: Let $A$ be a Noetherian ring. Then $A$ has finite global dimension if and only if $A$ is regular and the Krull dimension of $A$ is finite; in that case the global dimension of $A$ is equal to the Krull dimension. This result may be proven using Serre's theorem on regular local rings.

== See also ==
- Quillen–Suslin theorem
- Hilbert series and Hilbert polynomial
