= Auslander–Buchsbaum formula =

Algebraic formula

In commutative algebra, the Auslander–Buchsbaum formula, introduced by Auslander and Buchsbaum (1957, theorem 3.7), states that if R is a commutative Noetherian local ring and M is a non-zero finitely generated R-module of finite projective dimension, then:

$$\mathrm{pd}_R(M) + \mathrm{depth}(M) = \mathrm{depth}(R).$$

Here pd stands for the projective dimension of a module, and depth for the depth of a module.

== Applications ==
The Auslander–Buchsbaum theorem implies that a Noetherian local ring is regular if, and only if, it has finite global dimension. In turn this implies that the localization of a regular local ring is regular.

If A is a local finitely generated R-algebra (over a regular local ring R), then the Auslander–Buchsbaum formula implies that A is Cohen–Macaulay if, and only if, pd_{R}A = codim_{R}A.
