= Ausländer =

Ausländer or Auslander may refer to:

== Surname ==
- Joseph Auslander (1897–1965), American poet
- Leora Auslander (born 1959), American historian
- Louis Auslander (1928–1997), American mathematician
- Marc Auslander, American computer scientist
- Maurice Auslander (1926–1994), American mathematician
- Rose Ausländer (1901–1988), German and American poet
- Shalom Auslander (born 1970), American author and essayist

== Other uses ==
- "Ausländer" (Living Colour song)
- "Ausländer" (Rammstein song)
