= Maurice Auslander =

American mathematician

Maurice Auslander (August 3, 1926 – November 18, 1994) was an American mathematician who worked on commutative algebra, homological algebra and the representation theory of Artin algebras (e.g. finite-dimensional associative algebras over a field). He proved the Auslander–Buchsbaum theorem that regular local rings are factorial, the Auslander–Buchsbaum formula, and, in collaboration with Idun Reiten, introduced Auslander–Reiten theory and Auslander algebras.

Born in Brooklyn, New York, Auslander received his bachelor's degree and his Ph.D. (1954) from Columbia University. He was a visiting scholar at the Institute for Advanced Study in 1956-57. He was a professor at Brandeis University from 1957 until his death in Trondheim, Norway, aged 68. He was elected a Fellow of the American Academy of Arts and Sciences in 1971.

Auslander was married to Bernice Auslander, a professor emerita of mathematics at University of Massachusetts at Boston. He had two children. His son Philip Auslander became a professor in the School of Literature, Media, and Communication at Georgia Tech, and his daughter Leora Auslander became a professor of history at the University of Chicago. Maurice Auslander's brother Louis Auslander was also a mathematician.

== Selected publications ==
=== Articles ===
- with David Buchsbaum: Homological dimension in Noetherian rings, Trans. Amer. Math. Soc., vol. 85, 1957, pp. 390–405 doi:10.2307/1992937
- with Oscar Goldman: The Brauer group of a commutative ring, Trans. Amer. Math. Soc., vol. 97, no. 3, 1960, pp. 367–409 doi:10.2307/1993378
- Modules over unramified regular local rings, Illinois J. Math., vol. 5, 1961, pp. 631–647
- with Idun Reiten: Representation theory of Artin algebras. III. Almost split sequences, Communications in Algebra, vol. 3, 1975, pp. 239–294 doi:10.1080/00927877508822046
- with Idun Reiten: On a generalized version of the Nakayama conjecture, Proc. Amer. Math. Soc., vol. 52, 1975, pp. 69–74 doi:10.1090/S0002-9939-1975-0389977-6

=== Books ===
- with Mark Bridger: Stable module theory, American Mathematical Society 1969
- with David Buchsbaum: Groups, rings, modules, Harper and Row 1974; Auslander, Maurice; Buchsbaum, David (2014). Dover reprint. Courier Corporation. ISBN 978-0-486-49082-3.
- with Idun Reiten and Sverre O. Smalø: Representation theory of Artin algebras, Cambridge Studies in Advanced Mathematics, 36, Cambridge University Press, 1995 ISBN 0-521-41134-3
