= Koszul cohomology =

Cohomology groups associated to projective varieties

In mathematics, the Koszul cohomology groups $K_{p,q}(X,L)$ are groups associated to a projective variety $X$ with a line bundle $L$. They were introduced by Mark Lee Green and named after Jean-Louis Koszul as they are closely related to the Koszul complex.

Much work has been done on Koszul cohomology recently.

== Definitions ==
If $M$ is a graded module over the symmetric algebra of a vector space $V$, then the Koszul cohomology $K_{p,q}(M,V)$ of $M$ is the cohomology of the sequence

$$\bigwedge^{p+1}M_{q-1}\rightarrow \bigwedge^{p}M_{q} \rightarrow \bigwedge^{p-1}M_{q+1}$$.

If $L$ is a line bundle over a projective variety $X$, then the Koszul cohomology $K_{p,q}(X,L)$ is given by the Koszul cohomology $K_{p,q}(M,V)$ of the graded module $\textstyle M=\bigoplus_q H^0(L^q)$, viewed as a module over the symmetric algebra of the vector space $V=H^0(L)$.
