= Auslander–Buchsbaum theorem =

Algebraic theorem

In commutative algebra, the Auslander–Buchsbaum theorem states that regular local rings are unique factorization domains.

The theorem was first proved by Maurice Auslander and David Buchsbaum (1959). They showed that regular local rings of dimension 3 are unique factorization domains, and Masayoshi Nagata (1958) had previously shown that this implies that all regular local rings are unique factorization domains.
