= Matrix factorization (algebra) =

Algebra, a branch of mathematics

In homological algebra, a branch of mathematics, a matrix factorization is a tool used to study infinitely long resolutions, generally over commutative rings.

== Motivation ==
One of the problems with non-smooth algebras, such as Artin algebras, are their derived categories are poorly behaved due to infinite projective resolutions. For example, in the ring $R = \mathbb{C}[x]/(x^2)$ there is an infinite resolution of the $R$-module $\mathbb{C}$ where

$\cdots \xrightarrow{\cdot x} R \xrightarrow{\cdot x} R \xrightarrow{\cdot x} R \to \mathbb{C} \to 0$

Instead of looking at only the derived category of the module category, David Eisenbud studied such resolutions by looking at their periodicity. In general, such resolutions are periodic with period $2$ after finitely many objects in the resolution.

== Definition ==
For a commutative ring $S$ and an element $f \in S$, a matrix factorization of $f$ is a pair of n-by-n matrices $A,B$ such that $AB = f \cdot \text{Id}_n$. This can be encoded more generally as a $\mathbb{Z}/2$-graded $S$-module $M = M_0\oplus M_1$ with an endomorphism

$$d = \begin{bmatrix}0 & d_1 \\ d_0 & 0 \end{bmatrix}$$

such that $d^2 = f \cdot \text{Id}_M$.

=== Examples ===
(1) For $S = \mathbb{C}[[x]]$ and $f = x^n$ there is a matrix factorization $d_0:S \rightleftarrows S:d_1$ where $d_0=x^i, d_1 = x^{n-i}$ for $0 \leq i \leq n$.

(2) If $S = \mathbb{C}[[x,y,z]]$ and $f = xy + xz + yz$, then there is a matrix factorization $d_0:S^2 \rightleftarrows S^2:d_1$ where

$$d_0 = \begin{bmatrix} z & y \\ x & -x-y \end{bmatrix} \text{ } d_1 = \begin{bmatrix} x+y & y \\ x & -z \end{bmatrix}$$

== Periodicity ==
definition

=== Main theorem ===
Given a regular local ring $R$ and an ideal $I \subset R$ generated by an $A$-sequence, set $B = A/I$ and let

$$\cdots \to F_2 \to F_1 \to F_0 \to 0$$

be a minimal $B$-free resolution of the ground field. Then $F_\bullet$ becomes periodic after at most $1 + \text{dim}(B)$ steps. https://www.youtube.com/watch?v=2Jo5eCv9ZVY

=== Maximal Cohen-Macaulay modules ===
page 18 of eisenbud article

== See also ==
- Derived noncommutative algebraic geometry
- Derived category
- Homological algebra
- Triangulated category
