= Koszul–Tate resolution =

In mathematics, a Koszul–Tate resolution or Koszul–Tate complex of the quotient ring R/M is a projective resolution of it as an R-module which also has a structure of a dg-algebra over R, where R is a commutative ring and M ⊂ R is an ideal. They were introduced by Tate (1957) as a generalization of the Koszul resolution for the quotient R/(x_{1}, ...., x_{n}) of R by a regular sequence of elements. Friedemann Brandt, Glenn Barnich, and Marc Henneaux (2000) used the Koszul–Tate resolution to calculate BRST cohomology. The differential of this complex is called the Koszul–Tate derivation or Koszul–Tate differential.

== Construction ==
First suppose for simplicity that all rings contain the rational numbers Q. Assume we have a graded supercommutative ring X, so that

ab = (−1)^{deg(a)deg (b)}ba,

with a differential d, with

d(ab) = d(a)b + (−1)^{deg(a)}ad(b)),

and x ∈ X is a homogeneous cycle (dx = 0). Then we can form a new ring

Y = X[T]

of polynomials in a variable T, where the differential is extended to T by

dT=x.

(The polynomial ring is understood in the super sense, so if T has odd degree then T^{2} = 0.) The result of adding the element T is to kill off the element of the homology of X represented by x, and Y is still a supercommutative ring with derivation.

A Koszul–Tate resolution of R/M can be constructed as follows. We start with the commutative ring R (graded so that all elements have degree 0). Then add new variables as above of degree 1 to kill off all elements of the ideal M in the homology. Then keep on adding more and more new variables (possibly an infinite number) to kill off all homology of positive degree. We end up with a supercommutative graded ring with derivation d whose homology is just R/M.

If we are not working over a field of characteristic 0, the construction above still works, but it is usually neater to use the following variation of it. Instead of using polynomial rings X[T], one can use a "polynomial ring with divided powers" X〈T〉, which has a basis of elements

T^{(i)} for i ≥ 0,

where

T^{(i)}T^{(j)} = ((i + j)!/i!j!)T^{(i+j)}.

Over a field of characteristic 0,

T^{(i)} is just T^{i}/i!.

== See also ==
- Lie algebra cohomology
