= Hema Srinivasan =

Indian American mathematician

Hema Srinivasan (born 1959) is a mathematician specializing in commutative algebra and algebraic geometry. Originally from India, she is a professor of mathematics at the University of Missouri.

Srinivasan was a National Science Talent Scholar in India beginning in 1975. She obtained her B.Sc.(Hons) from Bombay University, where she won the Ghia Prize for mathematics in 1978, as well as an M.S. from Indiana University Bloomington in 1982. She completed her Ph.D. at Brandeis University in 1986. Her dissertation, supervised by David Buchsbaum, was Multiplicative Structures on Some Canonical Resolutions. After working as a Visiting Instructor at Michigan State University from 1986 to 1988 and as a Research Assistant Professor Purdue University from 1988 to 1989, she joined the University of Missouri faculty as an assistant professor in 1989. At Missouri, she has supervised 6 doctoral students and is currently the faculty advisor for the Association for Women in Mathematics Student Chapter.

She is part of the 2018 class of Fellows of the American Mathematical Society, elected "for contributions to algebra and algebraic geometry, mentoring, and service to the mathematical community".
