= Outline of algebraic structures =

Overview of and topical guide to algebraic structures

In mathematics, many types of algebraic structures are studied. Abstract algebra is primarily the study of specific algebraic structures and their properties. Algebraic structures may be viewed in different ways, however the common starting point of algebra texts is that an algebraic object incorporates one or more sets with one or more binary operations or unary operations satisfying a collection of axioms.

Another branch of mathematics known as universal algebra studies algebraic structures in general. From the universal algebra viewpoint, most structures can be divided into varieties and quasivarieties depending on the axioms used. Some axiomatic formal systems that are neither varieties nor quasivarieties, called nonvarieties, are sometimes included among the algebraic structures by tradition.

Concrete examples of each structure will be found in the articles listed.

Algebraic structures are so numerous today that this article will inevitably be incomplete. In addition to this, there are sometimes multiple names for the same structure, and sometimes one name will be defined by disagreeing axioms by different authors. Most structures appearing on this page will be common ones which most authors agree on. Other web lists of algebraic structures, organized more or less alphabetically, include Jipsen and PlanetMath. These lists mention many structures not included below, and may present more information about some structures than is presented here.

== Study of algebraic structures ==
Algebraic structures appear in most branches of mathematics, and one can encounter them in many different ways.

- Beginning study: In American universities, groups, vector spaces and fields are generally the first structures encountered in subjects such as linear algebra. They are usually introduced as sets with certain axioms.
- Advanced study:
  - Abstract algebra studies properties of specific algebraic structures.
  - Universal algebra studies algebraic structures abstractly, rather than specific types of structures.
    - Varieties
  - Category theory studies interrelationships between different structures, algebraic and non-algebraic. To study a non-algebraic object, it is often useful to use category theory to relate the object to an algebraic structure.
    - Example: The fundamental group of a topological space gives information about the topological space.

== Types of algebraic structures ==
In full generality, an algebraic structure may use any number of sets and any number of axioms in its definition. The most commonly studied structures, however, usually involve only one or two sets and one or two binary operations. The structures below are organized by how many sets are involved, and how many binary operations are used. Increased indentation is meant to indicate a more exotic structure, and the least indented levels are the most basic.

=== One set with no binary operations ===
- Set: a degenerate algebraic structure S having no operations.
- Pointed set: S has one or more distinguished elements, often 0, 1, or both.
- Unary system: S and a single unary operation over S.
- Pointed unary system: a unary system with S a pointed set.

=== One binary operation on one set ===
Group-like structures
| | Total | Associative | Identity | Divisible |
|---|---|---|---|---|
| Partial magma | Unneeded | Unneeded | Unneeded | Unneeded |
| Semigroupoid | Unneeded | Required | Unneeded | Unneeded |
| Small category | Unneeded | Required | Required | Unneeded |
| Groupoid | Unneeded | Required | Required | Required |
| Magma | Required | Unneeded | Unneeded | Unneeded |
| Quasigroup | Required | Unneeded | Unneeded | Required |
| Unital magma | Required | Unneeded | Required | Unneeded |
| Loop | Required | Unneeded | Required | Required |
| Semigroup | Required | Required | Unneeded | Unneeded |
| Associative quasigroup | Required | Required | Unneeded | Required |
| Monoid | Required | Required | Required | Unneeded |
| Group | Required | Required | Required | Required |

The following group-like structures consist of a set with a binary operation. The binary operation can be indicated by any symbol, or with no symbol (juxtaposition). The most common structure is that of a group. Other structures involve weakening or strengthening the axioms for groups, and may additionally use unary operations.

- Magma or groupoid: S and a single binary operation over S.
- Semigroup: an associative magma.
- Monoid: a semigroup with identity element.
- Group: a monoid with a unary operation (inverse), giving rise to inverse elements.
  - Abelian group: a group whose binary operation is commutative.
- Quasigroup: a magma obeying the Latin square property. A quasigroup may also be represented using three binary operations.
- Loop: a quasigroup with identity.
- Semilattice: a semigroup whose operation is idempotent and commutative. The binary operation can be called either meet or join. This is basically "half" of a lattice structure (see below).

=== Two binary operations on one set ===
The main types of structures with one set having two binary operations are ring-like or ringoids and lattice-like or simply lattices. Ringoids and lattices can be clearly distinguished despite both having two defining binary operations. In the case of ringoids, the two operations are linked by the distributive law; in the case of lattices, they are linked by the absorption law. Ringoids also tend to have numerical models, while lattices tend to have set-theoretic models.

In ring-like structures or ringoids, the two binary operations are often called addition and multiplication, with multiplication linked to addition by the distributive law.

- Semiring: a ringoid such that S is a monoid under each operation. Addition is typically assumed to be commutative and associative, and the monoid product is assumed to distribute over the addition on both sides, and the additive identity 0 is an absorbing element in the sense that 0 x = 0 for all x.
- Near-ring: a semiring whose additive monoid is a (not necessarily abelian) group.
- Ring: a semiring whose additive monoid is an abelian group.
  - Commutative ring: a ring in which the multiplication operation is commutative.
  - Division ring: a nontrivial ring in which division by nonzero elements is defined.
  - Integral domain: A nontrivial commutative ring in which the product of any two nonzero elements is nonzero.
  - Field: a commutative division ring (i.e. a commutative ring which contains a multiplicative inverse for every nonzero element).
- Nonassociative rings: These are like rings, but the multiplication operation need not be associative.
  - Lie ring: a ringoid whose additive monoid is an abelian group, but whose multiplicative operation satisfies the Jacobi identity rather than associativity.
  - Jordan ring: a commutative nonassociative ring that respects the Jordan identity
- Boolean ring: a commutative ring with idempotent multiplication operation.
- Kleene algebras: a semiring with idempotent addition and a unary operation, the Kleene star, satisfying additional properties.
- *-algebra or *-ring: a ring with an additional unary operation (*) known as an involution, satisfying additional properties.
- Arithmetic: addition and multiplication on an infinite set, with an additional pointed unary structure. The unary operation is injective successor, and has distinguished element 0.
  - Robinson arithmetic. Addition and multiplication are recursively defined by means of successor. 0 is the identity element for addition, and annihilates multiplication. Robinson arithmetic is listed here even though it is a variety, because of its closeness to Peano arithmetic.
  - Peano arithmetic. Robinson arithmetic with an axiom schema of induction. Most ring and field axioms bearing on the properties of addition and multiplication are theorems of Peano arithmetic or of proper extensions thereof.

Lattice-like structures have two binary operations called meet and join, connected by the absorption law.

- Latticoid: meet and join commute but need not associate.
- Skew lattice: meet and join associate but need not commute.
- Lattice: meet and join associate and commute.
  - Complete lattice: a lattice in which arbitrary meet and joins exist.
  - Bounded lattice: a lattice with a greatest element and least element.
  - Complemented lattice: a bounded lattice with a unary operation, complementation, denoted by postfix ^{⊥}. The join of an element with its complement is the greatest element, and the meet of the two elements is the least element.
  - Modular lattice: a lattice whose elements satisfy the additional modular identity.
  - Distributive lattice: a lattice in which each of meet and join distributes over the other. Distributive lattices are modular, but the converse does not hold.
  - Boolean algebra: a complemented distributive lattice. Either of meet or join can be defined in terms of the other and complementation. This can be shown to be equivalent with the ring-like structure of the same name above.
  - Heyting algebra: a bounded distributive lattice with an added binary operation, relative pseudo-complement, denoted by the infix operator →, and governed by the axioms:
    - x → x = 1
    - x (x → y) = x y
    - y (x → y) = y
    - x → (y z) = (x → y) (x → z)

=== Module-like structures on two sets ===
The following module-like structures have the common feature of having two sets, A and B, so that there is a binary operation from A×A into A and another operation from A×B into A. Modules, counting the ring operations, have at least three binary operations.

- Group with operators: a group G with a set Ω and a binary operation Ω × G → G satisfying certain axioms.
- Module: an abelian group M and a ring R acting as operators on M. Usually M is defined as "over R". The members of R are sometimes called scalars, and the binary operation of scalar multiplication is a function R × M → M, which satisfies several axioms.
  - Vector spaces: A module where the ring R is a division ring or a field.
    - Graded vector spaces: Vector spaces which are equipped with a direct sum decomposition into subspaces or "grades".
    - Quadratic space: a vector space V over a field F with a quadratic form on V taking values in F.
  - Other special types of modules, including free modules, projective modules, injective modules and flat modules are studied in abstract algebra.

=== Algebra-like structures on two sets ===
These structures are defined over two sets, a ring R and an R-module M equipped with an operation called multiplication. This can be viewed as a system with five binary operations: two operations on R, two on M and one involving both R and M. Many of these structures are hybrid structures of the previously mentioned ones.

- Algebra over a ring (also R-algebra): a module over a commutative ring R, which also carries a multiplication operation that is compatible with the module structure. This includes distributivity over addition and linearity with respect to multiplication by elements of R.
  - Algebra over a field: This is a ring which is also a vector space over a field. Multiplication is usually assumed to be associative. The theory is especially well developed.
- Associative algebra: an algebra over a ring such that the multiplication is associative.
- Nonassociative algebra: a module over a commutative ring, equipped with a ring multiplication operation that is not necessarily associative. Often associativity is replaced with a different identity, such as alternation, the Jacobi identity, or the Jordan identity.
  - Lie algebra: a special type of nonassociative algebra whose product satisfies the Jacobi identity.
  - Jordan algebra: a special type of nonassociative algebra whose product satisfies the Jordan identity.
- Coalgebra: a vector space with a "comultiplication" defined dually to that of associative algebras.
- Lie coalgebra: a vector space with a "comultiplication" defined dually to that of Lie algebras.
- Graded algebra: a graded vector space with an algebra structure compatible with the grading. The idea is that if the grades of two elements a and b are known, then the grade of ab is known, and so the location of the product ab is determined in the decomposition.
- Inner product space: an F-vector space V with a definite bilinear form V × V → F.
- Bialgebra: an associative algebra with a compatible coalgebra structure.
- Lie bialgebra: a Lie algebra with a compatible bialgebra structure.
- Hopf algebra: a bialgebra with a connection axiom (antipode).
- Clifford algebra: an associative $\Z_2$-graded algebra additionally equipped with an exterior product from which several possible inner products may be derived. Exterior algebras and geometric algebras are special cases of this construction.

== Algebraic structures with additional non-algebraic structure ==
There are many examples of mathematical structures where algebraic structure exists alongside non-algebraic structure.

- Topological vector spaces are vector spaces with a compatible topology.
- Lie groups: These are topological manifolds that also carry a compatible group structure.
- Ordered groups, ordered rings and ordered fields have algebraic structure compatible with an order on the set.
- Von Neumann algebras: these are *-algebras on a Hilbert space which are equipped with the weak operator topology.

== Algebraic structures in different disciplines ==
Some algebraic structures find uses in disciplines outside of abstract algebra. The following is meant to demonstrate some specific applications in other fields.

In physics:

- Lie groups are used extensively in physics. A few well-known ones include the orthogonal groups and the unitary groups.
- Lie algebras
- Inner product spaces
- Kac–Moody algebra
- The quaternions and more generally geometric algebras

In mathematical logic:

- Boolean algebras are both rings and lattices, under their two operations.
  - Heyting algebras are a special example of boolean algebras.
- Peano arithmetic
- Boundary algebra
- MV-algebra

In computer science:

- Max-plus algebra
- Syntactic monoid
- Transition monoid

== See also ==
- Abstract algebra
  - Outline of abstract algebra
- Universal algebra
  - Variety (universal algebra)
- Linear algebra
  - Outline of linear algebra
- Arity
- Category theory
- Free object
- Operation (mathematics)
- Signature (logic)
- First-order theories
- Mathematical lists
