= David Buchsbaum =

American mathematician (1929–2021)

David Alvin Buchsbaum (November 6, 1929 – January 8, 2021) was a mathematician at Brandeis University who worked on commutative algebra, homological algebra, and representation theory. He proved the Auslander–Buchsbaum formula and the Auslander–Buchsbaum theorem.

== Career ==
Buchsbaum earned his Ph.D. under Samuel Eilenberg in 1954 from Columbia University with thesis Exact Categories and Duality. Among his doctoral students are Peter J. Freyd and Hema Srinivasan. In 1995, he was elected to the American Academy of Arts and Sciences. In 2012, he became a fellow of the American Mathematical Society.

== See also ==
- Buchsbaum ring
