= Jean-Louis Koszul =

French mathematician

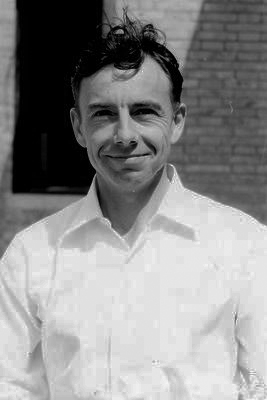
- Koszul in 1967
- Born: 3 January 1921; Strasbourg, France
- Died: 12 January 2018 (aged 97)
- Education: University of Strasbourg; École Normale Superieure
- Known for: Koszul complex Koszul duality Koszul connection
- Scientific career
- Fields: Mathematics
- Workplaces: University of Grenoble (Joseph Fourier University); University of Strasbourg; French Academy of Sciences
- Thesis: Homologie et cohomologie des algèbres de Lie (1950)
- Doctoral advisor: Henri Cartan

Jean-Louis Koszul (French: [kɔsyl]; 3 January 1921 – 12 January 2018) was a French mathematician, best known for studying geometry and discovering the Koszul complex. He was a second generation member of Bourbaki.

== Biography ==
Koszul was educated at the Lycée Fustel-de-Coulanges in Strasbourg before studying at the Faculty of Science University of Strasbourg and the Faculty of Science of the University of Paris. His Ph.D. thesis, titled Homologie et cohomologie des algèbres de Lie, was written in 1950 under the direction of Henri Cartan.

He lectured at many universities and was appointed in 1963 professor in the Faculty of Science at the University of Grenoble. He was a member of the French Academy of Sciences.

Koszul was the cousin of the French composer Henri Dutilleux, and the grandchild of the composer Julien Koszul.

Koszul married Denise Reyss-Brion on 17 July 1948. They had three children: Michel, Bertrand, and Anne.

He died on 12 January 2018, at the age of 97, nine days after his 97th birthday.

== See also ==
- Koszul algebra
- Koszul complex
- Koszul duality
- Koszul cohomology
- Koszul connection
- Koszul–Tate resolution
- Lie algebra cohomology
