= Homological dimension =

Homological dimension may refer to the global dimension of a ring. It may also refer to any other concept of dimension that is defined in terms of homological algebra, which includes:

- Projective dimension of a module, based on projective resolutions
- Injective dimension of a module, based on injective resolutions
- Weak dimension of a module, or flat dimension, based on flat resolutions
- Weak global dimension of a ring, based on the weak dimension of its modules
- Cohomological dimension of a group
