= Auslander–Reiten theory =

Algebraic theory

In algebra, Auslander–Reiten theory studies the representation theory of Artinian rings using techniques such as Auslander–Reiten sequences (also called almost split sequences) and Auslander–Reiten quivers. Auslander–Reiten theory was introduced by Maurice Auslander and Idun Reiten (1975) and developed by them in several subsequent papers.

For survey articles on Auslander–Reiten theory see Auslander (1982), Gabriel (1980), Reiten (1982), and the book Auslander, Reiten & Smalø (1997). Many of the original papers on Auslander–Reiten theory are reprinted in Auslander (1999a, 1999b).

== Almost-split sequences ==
Suppose that R is an Artin algebra. A sequence

0→ A → B → C → 0

of finitely generated left modules over R is called an almost-split sequence (or Auslander–Reiten sequence) if it has the following properties:

- The sequence is not split
- C is indecomposable and any homomorphism from an indecomposable module to C that is not an isomorphism factors through B.
- A is indecomposable and any homomorphism from A to an indecomposable module that is not an isomorphism factors through B.

For any finitely generated left module C that is indecomposable but not projective there is an almost-split sequence as above, which is unique up to isomorphism. Similarly for any finitely generated left module A that is indecomposable but not injective there is an almost-split sequence as above, which is unique up to isomorphism.

The module A in the almost split sequence is isomorphic to D Tr C, the dual of the transpose of C.

=== Example ===
Suppose that R is the ring k[x]/(x^{n}) for a field k and an integer n≥1. The indecomposable modules are isomorphic to one of k[x]/(x^{m}) for 1≤ m ≤ n, and the only projective one has m=n. The almost split sequences are isomorphic to

$$0 \rightarrow k[x]/(x^m) \rightarrow k[x]/(x^{m+1}) \oplus k[x]/(x^{m-1}) \rightarrow k[x]/(x^{m}) \rightarrow 0$$

for 1 ≤ m < n. The first morphism takes a to (xa, a) and the second takes (b,c) to b − xc.

== Auslander-Reiten quiver ==
The Auslander-Reiten quiver of an Artin algebra has a vertex for each indecomposable module and an arrow between vertices if there is an irreducible morphism between the corresponding modules. It has a map τ = D Tr called the translation from the non-projective vertices to the non-injective vertices, where D is the dual and Tr the transpose.
