= Trond Berg =

Norwegian cell physiologist

Trond Berg (born 1934) is a Norwegian cell physiologist.

He hails from the village of Svensby in Ullsfjord Municipality. After attending Troms Landsgymnas and the University of Oslo, he took his PHD at Rutgers University in 1968. He became a professor at the University of Tromsø and the University of Oslo; professor emeritus from 2004. He is a member of the Norwegian Academy of Science and Letters and won the Fridtjof Nansen Prize for Outstanding Research in 2008.

Awards
Preceded by Ola M. Johannessen	Recipient of the Fridtjof Nansen; Outstanding Research Award in Science; 2008	Succeeded by Idun Reiten
