= Krull–Schmidt category =

In category theory, a branch of mathematics, a Krull–Schmidt category is a generalization of categories in which the Krull–Schmidt theorem holds. They arise, for example, in the study of finite-dimensional modules over an algebra.

== Definition ==
Let C be an additive category, or more generally an additive R-linear category for a commutative ring R. We call C a Krull–Schmidt category provided that every object decomposes into a finite direct sum of objects having local endomorphism rings. Equivalently, C has split idempotents and the endomorphism ring of every object is semiperfect.

== Properties ==
One has the analogue of the Krull–Schmidt theorem in Krull–Schmidt categories:

An object is called indecomposable if it is not isomorphic to a direct sum of two nonzero objects. In a Krull–Schmidt category we have that

- an object is indecomposable if and only if its endomorphism ring is local.
- every object is isomorphic to a finite direct sum of indecomposable objects.
- if $X_1 \oplus X_2 \oplus \cdots \oplus X_r \cong Y_1 \oplus Y_2 \oplus \cdots \oplus Y_s$ where the $X_i$ and $Y_j$ are all indecomposable, then $r=s$, and there exists a permutation $\pi$ such that $X_{\pi(i)} \cong Y_i$ for all i.

One can define the Auslander–Reiten quiver of a Krull–Schmidt category.

== Examples ==
- An abelian category in which every object has finite length. This includes as a special case the category of finite-dimensional modules over an algebra.
- The category of finitely-generated modules over a finite R-algebra, where R is a commutative Noetherian complete local ring.
- The category of coherent sheaves on a complete variety over an algebraically-closed field.

=== A non-example ===
The category of finitely-generated projective modules over the integers has split idempotents, and every module is isomorphic to a finite direct sum of copies of the regular module, the number being given by the rank. Thus the category has unique decomposition into indecomposables, but is not Krull-Schmidt since the regular module does not have a local endomorphism ring.

== See also ==
- Quiver
- Karoubi envelope
