= Leora Auslander =

American historian (born 1959)

Leora Auslander (born 1959) is an American historian, best known for being Professor of European Social History and the Arthur and Joann Rasmussen Professor in Western Civilization at the University of Chicago in Chicago, Illinois.

== Life and career ==
Originally from New England, Auslander's travels outside the United States and jobs as a woodworker have deeply influenced her intellectual development and choice to go study history. Her parents were professors of mathematics - Bernice L. Auslander at University of Massachusetts at Boston and Maurice Auslander at Brandeis University.

Auslander received her A.B. in history and in Medieval and Renaissance studies from the University of Michigan in 1979, her A.M in history from Harvard University in 1982 and her Ph.D. in history from Brown University in 1988, where she studied under Joan W. Scott. She joined the University of Chicago faculty in 1987, and, after receiving tenure, was promoted to the rank of full professor. Auslander's work has been supported by prestigious fellowships at the Institute for Advanced Study (1992–93) and the Center for Advanced Study in the Behavioral Sciences (1995–96) in Palo Alto.

From 1996 to 1999, Auslander served as Director of the Center for Gender Studies at the University of Chicago. Leora Auslander was a Berthold Leibinger Fellow at the American Academy in Berlin, Germany, for Fall 2008.

She specializes in the history of France and Germany, focusing on 19th and 20th century social history; material culture and consumption; gender history and theory; Jewish history; and the history of colonial and post-colonial Europe. Auslander also has plans for a future project on the architectural and urban history of Dakar. She is primarily known for her work on material culture entitled Taste and Power, which details the history of interior design within modern France.

In 2023, Auslander received the Quantrell Award.

== Works ==
- Auslander, Leora (2009). Cultural Revolutions: Everyday Life and Politics in England, North America, and France. Berkeley and Los Angeles: University of California Press. ISBN 978-0-520-25920-1.
- Auslander, Leora (October 2005). "Beyond Words". American Historical Review. 110 (4): 1015–1045. doi:10.1086/ahr.110.4.1015. Archived from the original on 2007-08-20.
- Auslander, Leora (1996). Taste and Power: Furnishing Modern France. Berkeley: University of California Press.
