= Hilbert–Burch theorem =

Describes the structure of some free resolutions of a quotient of a local or graded ring

In mathematics, the Hilbert–Burch theorem describes the structure of some free resolutions of a quotient of a local or graded ring in the case that the quotient has projective dimension 2. Hilbert (1890) proved a version of this theorem for polynomial rings, and Burch (1968, p. 944) proved a more general version. Several other authors later rediscovered and published variations of this theorem. Eisenbud (1995, theorem 20.15) gives a statement and proof.

== Statement ==
If R is a local ring with an ideal I and

$$0 \rightarrow R^m\stackrel{f}{\rightarrow} R^n \rightarrow R \rightarrow R/I\rightarrow 0$$

is a free resolution of the R-module R/I, then m = n – 1 and the ideal I is aJ where a is a regular element of R and J, a depth-2 ideal, is the first Fitting ideal $\operatorname{Fitt}_1 I$ of I, i.e., the ideal generated by the determinants of the minors of size m of the matrix of f.
