= Weak dimension =

In abstract algebra, the weak dimension of a nonzero right module M over a ring R is the largest number n such that the Tor group $\operatorname{Tor}_n^R(M,N)$ is nonzero for some left R-module N (or infinity if no largest such n exists), and the weak dimension of a left R-module is defined similarly. The weak dimension was introduced by Henri Cartan and Samuel Eilenberg (1956, p.122). The weak dimension is sometimes called the flat dimension as it is the shortest length of the resolution of the module by flat modules. The weak dimension of a module is, at most, equal to its projective dimension.

The weak global dimension of a ring is the largest number n such that $\operatorname{Tor}_n^R(M,N)$ is nonzero for some right R-module M and left R-module N. If there is no such largest number n, the weak global dimension is defined to be infinite. It is at most equal to the left or right global dimension of the ring R.

== Examples ==
- The module $\Q$ of rational numbers over the ring $\Z$ of integers has weak dimension 0, but projective dimension 1.
- The module $\Q/\Z$ over the ring $\Z$ has weak dimension 1, but injective dimension 0.
- The module $\Z$ over the ring $\Z$ has weak dimension 0, but injective dimension 1.
- A Prüfer domain has weak global dimension at most 1.
- A Von Neumann regular ring has weak global dimension 0.
- A product of infinitely many fields has weak global dimension 0 but its global dimension is nonzero.
- If a ring is right Noetherian, then the right global dimension is the same as the weak global dimension, and is at most the left global dimension. In particular if a ring is right and left Noetherian then the left and right global dimensions and the weak global dimension are all the same.
- The triangular matrix ring
  $$\begin{bmatrix}\Z&\Q \\0&\Q \end{bmatrix}$$
  has right global dimension 1, weak global dimension 1, but left global dimension 2. It is right Noetherian, but not left Noetherian.
