= Stable range condition =

In mathematics, particular in abstract algebra and algebraic K-theory, the stable range of a ring $R$ is the smallest integer $n$ such that whenever $v_0,v_1,...,v_n$ in $R$ generate the unit ideal (they form a unimodular row), there exist some $t_1,...,t_n$in $R$ such that the elements $v_i - v_0t_i$ for $1\le i \le n$ also generate the unit ideal.

If $R$ is a commutative Noetherian ring of Krull dimension $d$ , then the stable range of $R$ is at most $d+1$ (a theorem of Bass).

== Bass stable range ==
The Bass stable range condition $SR_m$ refers to precisely the same notion, but for historical reasons it is indexed differently: a ring $R$ satisfies $SR_m$ if for any $v_1,...,v_m$ in $R$ generating the unit ideal there exist $t_2,...,t_m$ in $R$ such that $v_i - v_1t_i$ for $2\le i \le m$ generate the unit ideal.

Comparing with the above definition, a ring with stable range $n$ satisfies $SR_{n+1}$. In particular, Bass's theorem states that a commutative Noetherian ring of Krull dimension $d$ satisfies $SR_{d+2}$. (For this reason, one often finds hypotheses phrased as "Suppose that $R$ satisfies Bass's stable range condition $SR_{d+2}$...")

== Stable range relative to an ideal ==
Less commonly, one has the notion of the stable range of an ideal $I$ in a ring $R$. The stable range of the pair $(R,I)$ is the smallest integer $n$ such that for any elements $v_0,...,v_n$ in $R$ that generate the unit ideal and satisfy $v_n \equiv 1$ mod $I$ and $v_i \equiv 0$ mod $I$ for $0\le i \le n-1$, there exist $t_1,...,t_n$ in $R$ such that $v_i - v_0t_i$ for $1\le i \le n$ also generate the unit ideal. As above, in this case we say that $(R,I)$ satisfies the Bass stable range condition $SR_{n+1}$.

By definition, the stable range of $(R,I)$ is always less than or equal to the stable range of $R$.
