= Resolution (algebra) =

Exact sequence used to describe the structure of an object

In mathematics, and more specifically in homological algebra, a resolution (or left resolution; dually a coresolution or right resolution) is an exact sequence of modules (or, more generally, of objects of an abelian category) that is used to define invariants characterizing the structure of a specific module or object of this category. When, as usually, arrows are oriented to the right, the sequence is supposed to be infinite to the left for (left) resolutions, and to the right for right resolutions. However, a finite resolution is one where only finitely many of the objects in the sequence are non-zero; it is usually represented by a finite exact sequence in which the leftmost object (for resolutions) or the rightmost object (for coresolutions) is the zero-object.

Generally, the objects in the sequence are restricted to have some property P (for example to be free). Thus one speaks of a P resolution. In particular, every module has free resolutions, projective resolutions and flat resolutions, which are left resolutions consisting, respectively of free modules, projective modules or flat modules. Similarly every module has injective resolutions, which are right resolutions consisting of injective modules.

== Resolutions of modules ==
=== Definitions ===
Given a module $M$ over a ring $R$, a left resolution (or simply resolution) of $M$ is an exact sequence (possibly infinite) of $R$-modules

$$\cdots\overset{d_{n+1}}{\longrightarrow}E_n\overset{d_n}{\longrightarrow}\cdots\overset{d_3}{\longrightarrow}E_2\overset{d_2}{\longrightarrow}E_1\overset{d_1}{\longrightarrow}E_0\overset{\varepsilon}{\longrightarrow}M\longrightarrow0.$$

The homomorphisms $d_i$ are called boundary maps. The map $\varepsilon$ is called an augmentation map. For succinctness, the resolution above can be written as

$$E_\bullet\overset{\varepsilon}{\longrightarrow}M\longrightarrow0.$$

The dual notion is that of a right resolution (or coresolution, or simply resolution). Specifically, given a module $M$ over a ring $R$, a right resolution is a possibly infinite exact sequence of $R$-modules

$$0\longrightarrow M\overset{\varepsilon}{\longrightarrow}C^0\overset{d^0}{\longrightarrow}C^1\overset{d^1}{\longrightarrow}C^2\overset{d^2}{\longrightarrow}\cdots\overset{d^{n-1}}{\longrightarrow}C^n\overset{d^n}{\longrightarrow}\cdots,$$

where each $C^i$ is an $R$-module (it is common to use superscripts on the objects in the resolution and the maps between them to indicate the dual nature of such a resolution). For succinctness, the resolution above can be written as

$$0\longrightarrow M\overset{\varepsilon}{\longrightarrow}C^\bullet.$$

A (co)resolution is said to be finite if only finitely many of the modules involved are non-zero. The length of a finite resolution is the maximum index $n$ labeling a nonzero module in the finite resolution.

=== Free, projective, injective, and flat resolutions ===
In many circumstances conditions are imposed on the modules $E_i$ resolving the given module $M$. For example, a free resolution of a module $M$ is a left resolution in which all the modules $E_i$ are free $R$-modules. Likewise, projective and flat resolutions are left resolutions such that all the $E_i$ are projective and flat $R$-modules, respectively. Injective resolutions are right resolutions whose $C^i$ are all injective modules.

Every $R$-module possesses a free left resolution. A fortiori, every module also admits projective and flat resolutions. The proof idea is to define $E_0$ to be the free $R$-module generated by the elements of $M$, and then $E_1$ to be the free $R$-module generated by the elements of the kernel of the natural map $E_0$ → $M$ etc. Dually, every $R$-module possesses an injective resolution. Projective resolutions (and, more generally, flat resolutions) can be used to compute Tor functors.

Projective resolution of a module $M$ is unique up to a chain homotopy, i.e., given two projective resolutions $P_0\to M$ and $P_1\to M$ of $M$ there exists a chain homotopy between them.

Resolutions are used to define homological dimensions. The minimal length of a finite projective resolution of a module $M$ is called its projective dimension and denoted $\text{P-}\dim(M)$. For example, a module has projective dimension zero if and only if it is a projective module. If $M$ does not admit a finite projective resolution then the projective dimension is infinite. For example, for a commutative local ring $R$, the projective dimension is finite if and only if $R$ is regular and in this case it coincides with the Krull dimension of $R$. Analogously, the injective dimension $\text{I-}\dim(M)$ and flat dimension $\text{F-}\dim(M)$ are defined for modules also.

The injective and projective dimensions are used on the category of right $R$-modules to define a homological dimension for $R$ called the right global dimension of $R$. Similarly, flat dimension is used to define weak global dimension. The behavior of these dimensions reflects characteristics of the ring. For example, a ring has right global dimension 0 if and only if it is a semisimple ring, and a ring has weak global dimension 0 if and only if it is a von Neumann regular ring.

=== Graded modules and algebras ===
Let M be a graded module over a graded algebra, which is generated over a field by its elements of positive degree. Then M has a free resolution in which the free modules E_{i} may be graded in such a way that the d_{i} and ε are graded linear maps. Among these graded free resolutions, the minimal free resolutions are those for which the number of basis elements of each E_{i} is minimal. The number of basis elements of each E_{i} and their degrees are the same for all the minimal free resolutions of a graded module.

If I is a homogeneous ideal in a polynomial ring over a field, the Castelnuovo–Mumford regularity of the projective algebraic set defined by I is the minimal integer r such that the degrees of the basis elements of the E_{i} in a minimal free resolution of I are all lower than r-i.

=== Examples ===
A classic example of a free resolution is given by the Koszul complex of a regular sequence in a local ring or of a homogeneous regular sequence in a graded algebra finitely generated over a field.

Let X be an aspherical space, i.e., its universal cover E is contractible. Then every singular (or simplicial) chain complex of E is a free resolution of the module Z not only over the ring Z but also over the group ring Z [π_{1}(X)].

== Resolutions in abelian categories ==
The definition of resolutions of an object M in an abelian category A is the same as above, but the E_{i} and C^{i} are objects in A, and all maps involved are morphisms in A.

The analogous notion of projective and injective modules are projective and injective objects, and, accordingly, projective and injective resolutions. However, such resolutions need not exist in a general abelian category A. If every object of A has a projective (resp. injective) resolution, then A is said to have enough projectives (resp. enough injectives). Even if they do exist, such resolutions are often difficult to work with. For example, as pointed out above, every R-module has an injective resolution, but this resolution is not functorial, i.e., given a homomorphism M → M' , together with injective resolutions

$$0 \rightarrow M \rightarrow I_*, \ \ 0 \rightarrow M' \rightarrow I'_*,$$

there is in general no functorial way of obtaining a map between $I_*$ and $I'_*$.

=== Abelian categories without projective resolutions in general ===
One class of examples of Abelian categories without projective resolutions are the categories $\text{Coh}(X)$ of coherent sheaves on a scheme $X$. For example, if $X = \mathbb{P}^n_S$ is projective space, any coherent sheaf $\mathcal{M}$ on $X$ has a presentation given by an exact sequence

$$\bigoplus_{i,j=0} \mathcal{O}_X(s_{i,j}) \to \bigoplus_{i=0} \mathcal{O}_X(s_i) \to \mathcal{M} \to 0.$$

The first two terms are not in general projective since $H^n(\mathbb{P}^n_S,\mathcal{O}_X(s)) \neq 0$ for $s > 0$. But, both terms are locally free, and locally flat. Both classes of sheaves can be used in place for certain computations, replacing projective resolutions for computing some derived functors.

== Acyclic resolution ==
In many cases one is not really interested in the objects appearing in a resolution, but in the behavior of the resolution with respect to a given functor. Therefore, in many situations, the notion of acyclic resolutions is used: given a left exact functor F: A → B between two abelian categories, a resolution

$$0 \rightarrow M \rightarrow E_0 \rightarrow E_1 \rightarrow E_2 \rightarrow \cdots$$

of an object M of A is called F-acyclic, if the derived functors R_{i}F(E_{n}) vanish for all i > 0 and n ≥ 0. Dually, a left resolution is acyclic with respect to a right exact functor if its derived functors vanish on the objects of the resolution.

For example, given a R-module M, the tensor product $\otimes_R M$ is a right exact functor Mod(R) → Mod(R). Every flat resolution is acyclic with respect to this functor. A flat resolution is acyclic for the tensor product by every M. Similarly, resolutions that are acyclic for all the functors Hom( ⋅ , M) are the projective resolutions and those that are acyclic for the functors Hom(M, ⋅ ) are the injective resolutions.

Any injective (projective) resolution is F-acyclic for any left exact (right exact, respectively) functor.

The importance of acyclic resolutions lies in the fact that the derived functors R_{i}F (of a left exact functor, and likewise L_{i}F of a right exact functor) can be obtained from as the homology of F-acyclic resolutions: given an acyclic resolution $E_*$ of an object M, we have

$$R_i F(M) = H_i F(E_*),$$

where right hand side is the i-th homology object of the complex $F(E_*).$

This situation applies in many situations. For example, for the constant sheaf R on a differentiable manifold M can be resolved by the sheaves $\mathcal C^*(M)$ of smooth differential forms:

$$0 \rightarrow R \subset \mathcal C^0(M) \stackrel d \rightarrow \mathcal C^1(M) \stackrel d \rightarrow \cdots \stackrel d \rightarrow \mathcal C^{\dim M}(M) \rightarrow 0.$$

The sheaves $\mathcal C^*(M)$ are fine sheaves, which are known to be acyclic with respect to the global section functor $\Gamma: \mathcal F \mapsto \mathcal F(M)$. Therefore, the sheaf cohomology, which is the derived functor of the global section functor Γ is computed as $\mathrm H^i(M, \mathbf R) = \mathrm H^i( \mathcal C^*(M)).$

Similarly Godement resolutions are acyclic with respect to the global sections functor.

== See also ==
- Standard resolution
- Hilbert–Burch theorem
- Hilbert's syzygy theorem
- Free presentation
- Matrix factorizations (algebra)
