= Ideal theory =

Theory of ideals in commutative rings in mathematics

In mathematics, ideal theory is the theory of ideals in commutative rings. While the notion of an ideal exists also for non-commutative rings, a much more substantial theory exists only for commutative rings (and this article therefore only considers ideals in commutative rings.)

Throughout the articles, rings refer to commutative rings. See also the article ideal (ring theory) for basic operations such as sum or products of ideals.

== Ideals in a finitely generated algebra over a field ==
Ideals in a finitely generated algebra over a field (that is, a quotient of a polynomial ring over a field) behave somehow nicer than those in a general commutative ring. First, in contrast to the general case, if $A$ is a finitely generated algebra over a field, then the radical of an ideal in $A$ is the intersection of all maximal ideals containing the ideal (because $A$ is a Jacobson ring). This may be thought of as an extension of Hilbert's Nullstellensatz, which concerns the case when $A$ is a polynomial ring.

== Topology determined by an ideal ==
If I is an ideal in a ring A, then it determines the topology on A where a subset U of A is open if, for each x in U,

$$x + I^n \subset U.$$

for some integer $n > 0$. This topology is called the I-adic topology. It is also called an a-adic topology if $I = aA$ is generated by an element $a$.

For example, take $A = \mathbb{Z}$, the ring of integers and $I = pA$ an ideal generated by a prime number p. For each integer $x$, define $|x|_p = p^{-n}$ when $x = p^n y$, $y$ prime to $p$. Then, clearly,

$$x + p^n A = B(x, p^{-(n-1)})$$

where $B(x, r) = \{ z \in \mathbb{Z} \mid |z - x|_p < r \}$ denotes an open ball of radius $r$ with center $x$. Hence, the $p$-adic topology on $\mathbb{Z}$ is the same as the metric space topology given by $d(x, y) = |x - y|_p$. As a metric space, $\mathbb{Z}$ can be completed. The resulting complete metric space has a structure of a ring that extended the ring structure of $\mathbb{Z}$; this ring is denoted as $\mathbb{Z}_p$ and is called the ring of p-adic integers.

== Ideal class group ==
In a Dedekind domain A (e.g., a ring of integers in a number field or the coordinate ring of a smooth affine curve) with the field of fractions $K$, an ideal $I$ is invertible in the sense: there exists a fractional ideal $I^{-1}$ (that is, an A-submodule of $K$) such that $I \, I^{-1} = A$, where the product on the left is a product of submodules of K. In other words, fractional ideals form a group under a product. The quotient of the group of fractional ideals by the subgroup of principal ideals is then the ideal class group of A.

In a general ring, an ideal may not be invertible (in fact, already the definition of a fractional ideal is not clear). However, over a Noetherian integral domain, it is still possible to develop some theory generalizing the situation in Dedekind domains. For example, Ch. VII of Bourbaki's Algèbre commutative gives such a theory.

The ideal class group of A, when it can be defined, is closely related to the Picard group of the spectrum of A (often the two are the same; e.g., for Dedekind domains).

In algebraic number theory, especially in class field theory, it is more convenient to use a generalization of an ideal class group called an idele class group.

== Closure operations ==
There are several operations on ideals that play roles of closures. The most basic one is the radical of an ideal. Another is the integral closure of an ideal. Given an irredundant primary decomposition $I = \cap Q_i$, the intersection of $Q_i$'s whose radicals are minimal (don’t contain any of the radicals of other $Q_j$'s) is uniquely determined by $I$; this intersection is then called the unmixed part of $I$. It is also a closure operation.

Given ideals $I, J$ in a ring $A$, the ideal

$$(I : J^{\infty}) = \{ f \in A \mid fJ^n \subset I, n \gg 0 \} = \bigcup_{n > 0} \operatorname{Ann}_A((J^n + I)/I)$$

is called the saturation of $I$ with respect to $J$ and is a closure operation (this notion is closely related to the study of local cohomology).

See also tight closure.

== Local cohomology in ideal theory ==
Local cohomology can sometimes be used to obtain information on an ideal. This section assumes some familiarity with sheaf theory and scheme theory.

Let $M$ be a module over a ring $R$ and $I$ an ideal. Then $M$ determines the sheaf $\widetilde{M}$ on $Y = \operatorname{Spec}(R) - V(I)$ (the restriction to Y of the sheaf associated to M). Unwinding the definition, one sees:

$$\Gamma_I(M) := \Gamma(Y, \widetilde{M}) = \varinjlim \operatorname{Hom}(I^n, M)$$.

Here, $\Gamma_I(M)$ is called the ideal transform of $M$ with respect to $I$.

== See also ==
- System of parameters
