= Depth (ring theory) =

Invariant of rings and modules

In commutative and homological algebra, depth is an important invariant of rings and modules. Although depth can be defined more generally, the most common case considered is the case of modules over a commutative Noetherian local ring. In this case, the depth of a module is related with its projective dimension by the Auslander–Buchsbaum formula. A more elementary property of depth is the inequality

$$\mathrm{depth}(M) \leq \dim(M),$$

where $\dim M$ denotes the Krull dimension of the module $M$. Depth is used to define classes of rings and modules with good properties, for example, Cohen-Macaulay rings and modules, for which equality holds.

== Definition ==
Let $R$ be a commutative ring, $I$ an ideal of $R$ and $M$ a finitely generated $R$-module with the property that $I M$ is properly contained in $M$. (That is, some elements of $M$ are not in $I M$.) Then the $I$-depth of $M$, also commonly called the grade of $M$, is defined as

$$\mathrm{depth}_I(M) = \min \{i: \operatorname{Ext}^i(R/I,M)\ne 0\}.$$

By definition, the depth of a local ring $R$ with a maximal ideal $\mathfrak{m}$ is its $\mathfrak{m}$-depth as a module over itself. If $R$ is a Cohen-Macaulay local ring, then depth of $R$ is equal to the dimension of $R$.

By a theorem of David Rees, the depth can also be characterized using the notion of a regular sequence.

=== Theorem (Rees) ===
Suppose that $R$ is a commutative Noetherian local ring with the maximal ideal $\mathfrak{m}$ and $M$ is a finitely generated $R$-module. Then all maximal regular sequences $x_1, \ldots, x_n$ for $M$, where each $x_i$ belongs to $\mathfrak{m}$, have the same length $n$ equal to the $\mathfrak{m}$-depth of $M$.

== Depth and projective dimension ==
The projective dimension and the depth of a module over a commutative Noetherian local ring are complementary to each other. This is the content of the Auslander–Buchsbaum formula, which is not only of fundamental theoretical importance, but also provides an effective way to compute the depth of a module. Suppose that $R$ is a commutative Noetherian local ring with the maximal ideal $\mathfrak{m}$ and $M$ is a finitely generated $R$-module. If the projective dimension of $M$ is finite, then the Auslander–Buchsbaum formula states

$$\mathrm{pd}_R(M) + \mathrm{depth}(M) = \mathrm{depth}(R).$$

== Depth zero rings ==
A commutative Noetherian local ring $R$ has depth zero if and only if its maximal ideal $\mathfrak{m}$ is an associated prime, or, equivalently, when there is a nonzero element $x$ of $R$ such that $x\mathfrak{m}=0$ (that is, $x$ annihilates $\mathfrak{m}$). This means, essentially, that the closed point is an embedded component.

For example, the ring $k[x,y]/(x^2,xy)$ (where $k$ is a field), which represents a line ($x=0$) with an embedded double point at the origin, has depth zero at the origin, but dimension one: this gives an example of a ring which is not Cohen–Macaulay.
