= Regular sequence =

Well-behaved sequence in a commutative ring

In commutative algebra, a regular sequence is a sequence of elements of a commutative ring which are as independent as possible, in a precise sense. This is the algebraic analogue of the geometric notion of a complete intersection.

== Definitions ==
Given a commutative ring R and an R-module M, an element r in R is called a non-zero-divisor on M if r m = 0 implies m = 0 for m in M. An M-regular sequence is a sequence r_{1}, ..., r_{d} of elements of R such that r_{1} is a not a zero-divisor on M and r_{i} is a not a zero-divisor on M/(r_{1}, ..., r_{i−1})M for i = 2, ..., d. Some authors also require that M/(r_{1}, ..., r_{d})M is not zero. Intuitively, to say that r_{1}, ..., r_{d} is an M-regular sequence means that these elements "cut M down" as much as possible, when we pass successively from M to M/(r_{1})M, to M/(r_{1}, r_{2})M, and so on.

An R-regular sequence is called simply a regular sequence. That is, r_{1}, ..., r_{d} is a regular sequence if r_{1} is a non-zero-divisor in R, r_{2} is a non-zero-divisor in the ring R/(r_{1}), and so on. In geometric language, if X is an affine scheme and r_{1}, ..., r_{d} is a regular sequence in the ring of regular functions on X, then we say that the closed subscheme {r_{1}=0, ..., r_{d}=0} ⊂ X is a complete intersection subscheme of X.

Being a regular sequence may depend on the order of the elements. For example, x, y(1-x), z(1-x) is a regular sequence in the polynomial ring C[x, y, z], while y(1-x), z(1-x), x is not a regular sequence. Geometrically, in xyz-space C^{3}, successively intersecting the varieties V(x), V(y(1-x)), V(z(1-x)) gives the plane (x = 0), then the line (x = y = 0), and finally the point (x = y = z = 0), decreasing dimension by 1 at each step. However, successively intersecting V(y(1-x)), V(z(1-x)), V(x) gives: the union of the planes (y = 0) and (x = 1); then the union of the x-axis (y = z = 0) and the plane (x = 1); and finally the point (x = y = z = 0). The second step contains a plane, failing to decrease dimension, and indeed z(1-x) is a zero-divisor in the ring C[x,y,z]/(y(1-x)) since z(1-x), y ≠ 0 but z(1-x)y = 0.

However, if R is a Noetherian local ring and the elements r_{i} are in the maximal ideal, or if R is a graded ring and the r_{i} are homogeneous of positive degree, then any permutation of a regular sequence is a regular sequence. Indeed, in the example above, the failure of regularity occurred because of an extra plane far away from the eventual intersection point (x = y = z = 0): this could not happen in a local ring, whose ideals see only the neighborhood of the intersection point.

Let R be a Noetherian ring, I an ideal in R, and M a finitely generated R-module. The depth of I on M, written depth_{R}(I, M) or just depth(I, M), is the supremum of the lengths of all M-regular sequences of elements of I. When R is a Noetherian local ring and M is a finitely generated R-module, the depth of M, written depth_{R}(M) or just depth(M), means depth_{R}(m, M); that is, it is the supremum of the lengths of all M-regular sequences in the maximal ideal m of R. In particular, the depth of a Noetherian local ring R means the depth of R as a R-module. That is, the depth of R is the maximum length of a regular sequence in the maximal ideal.

For a Noetherian local ring R, the depth of the zero module is ∞, whereas the depth of a nonzero finitely generated R-module M is at most the Krull dimension of M (also called the dimension of the support of M).

== Examples ==
- Given an integral domain $R$ any nonzero $f \in R$ gives a regular sequence.
- For a prime number p, the local ring Z_{(p)} is the subring of the rational numbers consisting of fractions whose denominator is not a multiple of p. The element p is a non-zero-divisor in Z_{(p)}, and the quotient ring of Z_{(p)} by the ideal generated by p is the field Z/(p). Therefore p cannot be extended to a longer regular sequence in the maximal ideal (p), and in fact the local ring Z_{(p)} has depth 1.
- For any field k, the elements x_{1}, ..., x_{n} in the polynomial ring A = k[x_{1}, ..., x_{n}] form a regular sequence. It follows that the localization R of A at the maximal ideal m = (x_{1}, ..., x_{n}) has depth at least n. In fact, R has depth equal to n; that is, there is no regular sequence in the maximal ideal of length greater than n.
- More generally, let R be a regular local ring with maximal ideal m. Then any elements r_{1}, ..., r_{d} of m which map to a basis for m/m^{2} as an R/m-vector space form a regular sequence.

An important case is when the depth of a local ring R is equal to its Krull dimension: R is then said to be Cohen-Macaulay. The three examples shown are all Cohen-Macaulay rings. Similarly, a finitely generated R-module M is said to be Cohen-Macaulay if its depth equals its dimension.

=== Non-Examples ===
A simple non-example of a regular sequence is given by the sequence $(xy,x^2)$ of elements in $\mathbb{C}[x,y]$ since

$$\cdot x^2 : \frac{\mathbb{C}[x,y]}{(xy)} \to \frac{\mathbb{C}[x,y]}{(xy)}$$

has a non-trivial kernel given by the ideal $(y) \subset \mathbb{C}[x,y]/(xy)$ . Similar examples can be found by looking at minimal generators for the ideals generated from reducible schemes with multiple components and taking the subscheme of a component, but fattened.

== Applications ==
- If r_{1}, ..., r_{d} is a regular sequence in a ring R, then the Koszul complex is an explicit free resolution of R/(r_{1}, ..., r_{d}) as an R-module, of the form:

$$0\rightarrow R^{\binom{d}{d}} \rightarrow\cdots \rightarrow
R^{\binom{d}{1}} \rightarrow R \rightarrow R/(r_1,\ldots,r_d)
\rightarrow 0$$

In the special case where R is the polynomial ring k[r_{1}, ..., r_{d}], this gives a resolution of k as an R-module.

- If I is an ideal generated by a regular sequence in a ring R, then the associated graded ring

$$\oplus_{j\geq 0} I^j/I^{j+1}$$

is isomorphic to the polynomial ring (R/I)[x_{1}, ..., x_{d}]. In geometric terms, it follows that a local complete intersection subscheme Y of any scheme X has a normal bundle which is a vector bundle, even though Y may be singular.

== See also ==
- Complete intersection ring
- Koszul complex
- Depth (ring theory)
- Cohen-Macaulay ring
