= Triangular matrix ring =

In algebra, a triangular matrix ring, also called a triangular ring, is a ring constructed from two rings and a bimodule.

== Definition ==
If $T$ and $U$ are rings and $M$ is a $\left(U,T\right)$-bimodule, then the triangular matrix ring $R:=\left[\begin{array}{cc}T&0\\M&U\\\end{array}\right]$ consists of 2-by-2 matrices of the form $\left[\begin{array}{cc}t&0\\m&u\\\end{array}\right]$, where $t\in T,m\in M,$ and $u\in U,$ with ordinary matrix addition and matrix multiplication as its operations.
