= Artin algebra =

In algebra, an Artin algebra is an algebra Λ over a commutative Artin ring R that is a finitely generated R-module. They are named after Emil Artin.

Every Artin algebra is an Artin ring.

== Dual and transpose ==
There are several different dualities taking finitely generated modules over Λ to modules over the opposite algebra Λ^{op}.

- If M is a left Λ-module then the right Λ-module M^{*} is defined to be Hom_{Λ}(M,Λ).
- The dual D(M) of a left Λ-module M is the right Λ-module D(M) = Hom_{R}(M,J), where J is the dualizing module of R, equal to the sum of the injective envelopes of the non-isomorphic simple R-modules or equivalently the injective envelope of R/rad R. The dual of a left module over Λ does not depend on the choice of R (up to isomorphism).
- The transpose Tr(M) of a left Λ-module M is a right Λ-module defined to be the cokernel of the map Q^{*} → P^{*}, where P → Q → M → 0 is a minimal projective presentation of M.

== See also ==
- Wedderburn–Artin theorem
