= Global dimension =

Concept in ring theory and homological algebra

In ring theory and homological algebra, the global dimension (or global homological dimension; sometimes just called homological dimension) of a ring A denoted gl dim A, is a non-negative integer or infinity which is a homological invariant of the ring. It is defined to be the supremum of the set of projective dimensions of all A-modules. Global dimension is an important technical notion in the dimension theory of Noetherian rings. By a theorem of Jean-Pierre Serre, global dimension can be used to characterize within the class of commutative Noetherian local rings those rings which are regular. Their global dimension coincides with the Krull dimension, whose definition is module-theoretic.

When the ring A is noncommutative, one initially has to consider two versions of this notion, right global dimension that arises from consideration of the right A-modules, and left global dimension that arises from consideration of the left A-modules. For an arbitrary ring A the right and left global dimensions may differ. However, if A is a Noetherian ring, both of these dimensions turn out to be equal to weak global dimension, whose definition is left-right symmetric. Therefore, for noncommutative Noetherian rings, these two versions coincide and one is justified in talking about the global dimension.

== Examples ==
- Let A = K[x_{1},...,x_{n}] be the ring of polynomials in n variables over a field K. Then the global dimension of A is equal to n. This statement goes back to David Hilbert's foundational work on homological properties of polynomial rings; see Hilbert's syzygy theorem. More generally, if R is a Noetherian ring of finite global dimension k and A = R[x] is a ring of polynomials in one variable over R then the global dimension of A is equal to k + 1.
- A ring has global dimension zero if and only if it is semisimple.
- The global dimension of a ring A is less than or equal to one if and only if A is hereditary. In particular, a commutative principal ideal domain which is not a field has global dimension one. For example $\mathbb{Z}$ has global dimension one.
- The first Weyl algebra A_{1} is a noncommutative Noetherian domain of global dimension one.
- If a ring is right Noetherian, then the right global dimension is the same as the weak global dimension, and is at most the left global dimension. In particular if a ring is right and left Noetherian then the left and right global dimensions and the weak global dimension are all the same.
- The triangular matrix ring
  $$\begin{bmatrix}\mathbb Z&\mathbb Q \\0&\mathbb Q \end{bmatrix}$$
  has right global dimension 1, weak global dimension 1, but left global dimension 2. It is right Noetherian but not left Noetherian.

== Alternative characterizations ==
The right global dimension of a ring A can be alternatively defined as:

- the supremum of the set of projective dimensions of all cyclic right A-modules;
- the supremum of the set of projective dimensions of all finite right A-modules;
- the supremum of the injective dimensions of all right A-modules;
- when A is a commutative Noetherian local ring with maximal ideal m, the projective dimension of the residue field A/m.

The left global dimension of A has analogous characterizations obtained by replacing "right" with "left" in the above list.

Serre proved that a commutative Noetherian local ring A is regular if and only if it has finite global dimension, in which case the global dimension coincides with the Krull dimension of A. This theorem opened the door to application of homological methods to commutative algebra.
