= Commutative algebra =

Branch of algebra that studies commutative rings

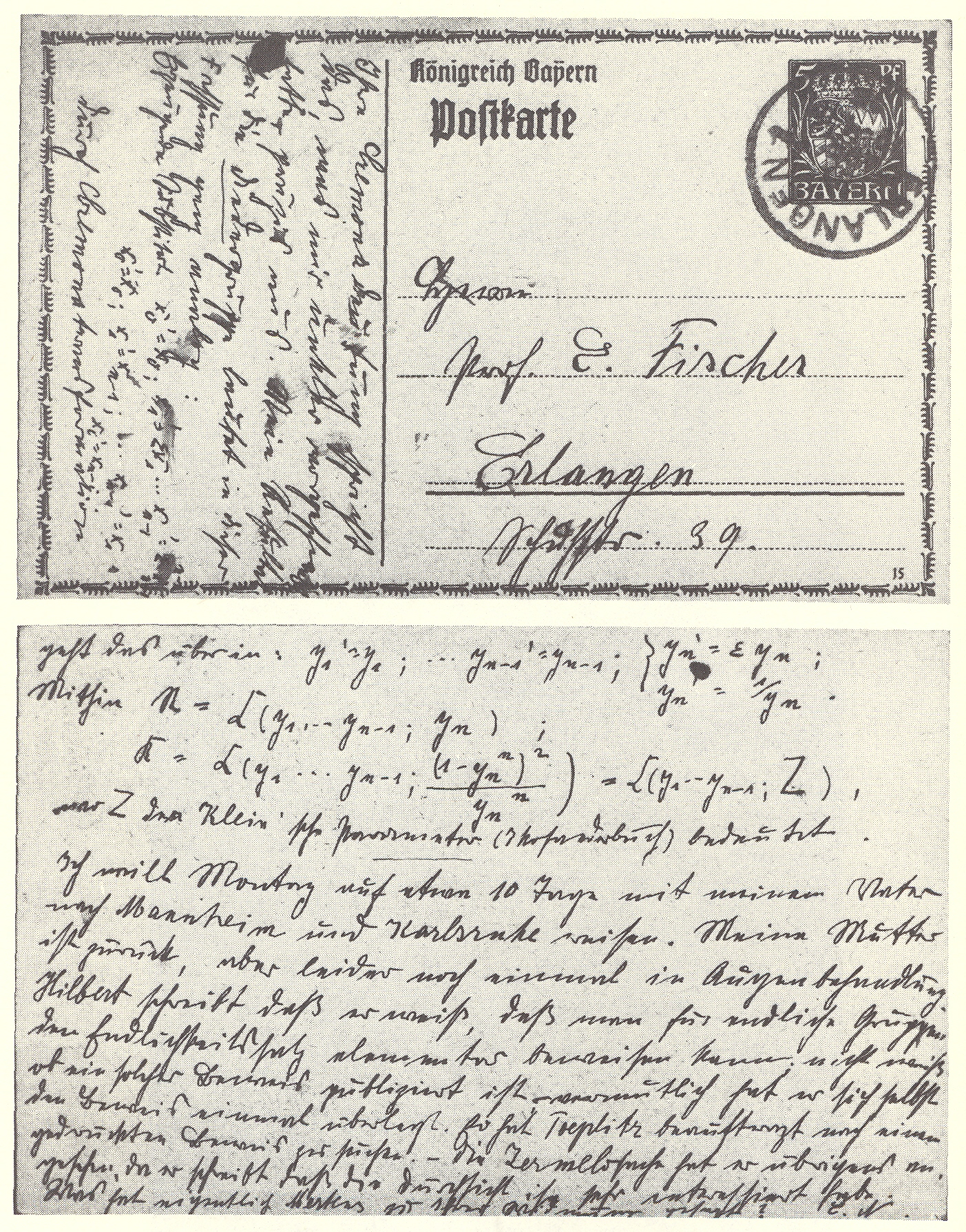
A 1915 postcard from one of the pioneers of commutative algebra, Emmy Noether, to E. Fischer, discussing her work in commutative algebra

Commutative algebra, first known as ideal theory, is the branch of algebra that studies commutative rings, their ideals, and modules over such rings. Both algebraic geometry and algebraic number theory build on commutative algebra. Prominent examples of commutative rings include polynomial rings; rings of algebraic integers, including the ordinary integers $\mathbb{Z}$; and p-adic integers.

Commutative algebra is the main technical tool of algebraic geometry, and many results and concepts of commutative algebra are strongly related with geometrical concepts.

The study of rings that are not necessarily commutative is known as noncommutative algebra; it includes ring theory, representation theory, and the theory of Banach algebras.

== Overview ==
Commutative algebra is essentially the study of the rings occurring in algebraic number theory and algebraic geometry.

Several concepts of commutative algebras have been developed in relation with algebraic number theory, such as Dedekind rings (the main class of commutative rings occurring in algebraic number theory), integral extensions, and valuation rings.

Polynomial rings in several indeterminates over a field are examples of commutative rings. Since algebraic geometry is fundamentally the study of the common zeros of these rings, many results and concepts of algebraic geometry have counterparts in commutative algebra, and their names recall often their geometric origin; for example "Krull dimension", "localization of a ring", "local ring", "regular ring".

An affine algebraic variety corresponds to a prime ideal in a polynomial ring, and the points of such an affine variety correspond to the maximal ideals that contain this prime ideal. The Zariski topology, originally defined on an algebraic variety, has been extended to the sets of the prime ideals of any commutative ring; for this topology, the closed sets are the sets of prime ideals that contain a given ideal.

The spectrum of a ring is a ringed space formed by the prime ideals equipped with the Zariski topology, and the localizations of the ring at the open sets of a basis of this topology. This is the starting point of scheme theory, a generalization of algebraic geometry introduced by Grothendieck, which is strongly based on commutative algebra, and has induced, in turns, many developments of commutative algebra.

== History ==
The subject, first known as ideal theory, began with Richard Dedekind's work on ideals, itself based on the earlier work of Ernst Kummer and Leopold Kronecker. Later, David Hilbert introduced the term ring to generalize the earlier term number ring. Hilbert introduced a more abstract approach to replace the more concrete and computationally oriented methods grounded in such things as complex analysis and classical invariant theory. In turn, Hilbert strongly influenced Emmy Noether, who recast many earlier results in terms of an ascending chain condition, now known as the Noetherian condition. Another important milestone was the work of Hilbert's student Emanuel Lasker, who introduced primary ideals and proved the first version of the Lasker–Noether theorem.

The main figure responsible for the birth of commutative algebra as a mature subject was Wolfgang Krull, who introduced the fundamental notions of localization and completion of a ring, as well as that of regular local rings. He established the concept of the Krull dimension of a ring, first for Noetherian rings before moving on to expand his theory to cover general valuation rings and Krull rings. To this day, Krull's principal ideal theorem is widely considered the single most important foundational theorem in commutative algebra. These results paved the way for the introduction of commutative algebra into algebraic geometry, an idea which would revolutionize the latter subject.

Much of the modern development of commutative algebra emphasizes modules. Both ideals of a ring R and R-algebras are special cases of R-modules, so module theory encompasses both ideal theory and the theory of ring extensions. Though it was already incipient in Kronecker's work, the modern approach to commutative algebra using module theory is usually credited to Krull and Noether.

== Main tools and results ==
=== Noetherian rings ===
A Noetherian ring, named after Emmy Noether, is a ring in which every ideal is finitely generated; that is, all elements of any ideal can be written as a linear combinations of a finite set of elements, with coefficients in the ring.

Many commonly considered commutative rings are Noetherian, in particular, every field, the integers, and every polynomial ring in one or several indeterminates over them. The fact that polynomial rings over a field are Noetherian is called Hilbert's basis theorem.

Moreover, many ring constructions preserve the Noetherian property. In particular, if a commutative ring R is Noetherian, the same is true for every polynomial ring over it, and for every quotient ring, localization, or completion of the ring.

The importance of the Noetherian property lies in its ubiquity and also in the fact that many important theorems of commutative algebra require that the involved rings are Noetherian, This is the case, in particular of Lasker–Noether theorem, the Krull intersection theorem, and Nakayama's lemma.

Furthermore, if a ring is Noetherian, then it satisfies the descending chain condition on prime ideals, which implies that every Noetherian local ring has a finite Krull dimension.

=== Primary decomposition ===
An ideal Q of a ring is said to be primary if Q is proper and whenever xy ∈ Q, either x ∈ Q or y^{n} ∈ Q for some positive integer n. In Z, the primary ideals are precisely the ideals of the form (p^{e}) where p is prime and e is a positive integer. Thus, a primary decomposition of (n) corresponds to representing (n) as the intersection of finitely many primary ideals.

The Lasker–Noether theorem, given here, may be seen as a certain generalization of the fundamental theorem of arithmetic:

Lasker-Noether Theorem—Let R be a commutative Noetherian ring and let I be an ideal of R. Then I may be written as the intersection of finitely many primary ideals with distinct radicals; that is:

$$I=\bigcap_{i=1}^t Q_i$$

with Q_{i} primary for all i and Rad(Q_{i}) ≠ Rad(Q_{j}) for i ≠ j. Furthermore, if:

$$I=\bigcap_{i=1}^k P_i$$

is decomposition of I with Rad(P_{i}) ≠ Rad(P_{j}) for i ≠ j, and both decompositions of I are irredundant (meaning that no proper subset of either {Q_{1}, ..., Q_{t}} or {P_{1}, ..., P_{k}} yields an intersection equal to I), t = k and (after possibly renumbering the Q_{i}) Rad(Q_{i}) = Rad(P_{i}) for all i.

For any primary decomposition of I, the set of all radicals, that is, the set {Rad(Q_{1}), ..., Rad(Q_{t})} remains the same by the Lasker–Noether theorem. In fact, it turns out that (for a Noetherian ring) the set is precisely the assassinator of the module R/I; that is, the set of all annihilators of R/I (viewed as a module over R) that are prime.

=== Localization ===
The localization is a formal way to introduce the "denominators" to a given ring or a module. That is, it introduces a new ring/module out of an existing one so that it consists of fractions

$$\frac{m}{s}$$.

where the denominators s range in a given subset S of R. The archetypal example is the construction of the ring Q of rational numbers from the ring Z of integers.

=== Completion ===
A completion is any of several related functors on rings and modules that result in complete topological rings and modules. Completion is similar to localization, and together they are among the most basic tools in analysing commutative rings. Complete commutative rings have simpler structure than the general ones and Hensel's lemma applies to them.

=== Zariski topology on prime ideals ===
The Zariski topology defines a topology on the spectrum of a ring (the set of prime ideals). In this formulation, the Zariski-closed sets are taken to be the sets

$$V(I) = \{P \in \operatorname{Spec}\,(A) \mid I \subseteq P\}$$

where A is a fixed commutative ring and I is an ideal. This is defined in analogy with the classical Zariski topology, where closed sets in affine space are those defined by polynomial equations . To see the connection with the classical picture, note that for any set S of polynomials (over an algebraically closed field), it follows from Hilbert's Nullstellensatz that the points of V(S) (in the old sense) are exactly the tuples (a_{1}, ..., a_{n}) such that the ideal (x_{1} - a_{1}, ..., x_{n} - a_{n}) contains S; moreover, these are maximal ideals and by the "weak" Nullstellensatz, an ideal of any affine coordinate ring is maximal if and only if it is of this form. Thus, V(S) is "the same as" the maximal ideals containing S. Grothendieck's innovation in defining Spec was to replace maximal ideals with all prime ideals; in this formulation it is natural to simply generalize this observation to the definition of a closed set in the spectrum of a ring.

== Connections with algebraic geometry ==
Commutative algebra (in the form of polynomial rings and their quotients, used in the definition of algebraic varieties) has always been a part of algebraic geometry. However, in the late 1950s, algebraic varieties were subsumed into Alexander Grothendieck's concept of a scheme. Their local objects are affine schemes or prime spectra, which are locally ringed spaces, which form a category that is antiequivalent (dual) to the category of commutative unital rings, extending the duality between the category of affine algebraic varieties over a field k, and the category of finitely generated reduced k-algebras. The gluing is along the Zariski topology; one can glue within the category of locally ringed spaces, but also, using the Yoneda embedding, within the more abstract category of presheaves of sets over the category of affine schemes. The Zariski topology in the set-theoretic sense is then replaced by a Zariski topology in the sense of Grothendieck topology. Grothendieck introduced Grothendieck topologies having in mind more exotic but geometrically finer and more sensitive examples than the crude Zariski topology, namely the étale topology, and the two flat Grothendieck topologies: fppf and fpqc. Nowadays some other examples have become prominent, including the Nisnevich topology. Sheaves can be furthermore generalized to stacks in the sense of Grothendieck, usually with some additional representability conditions, leading to Artin stacks and, even finer, Deligne–Mumford stacks, both often called algebraic stacks.

== See also ==
- List of commutative algebra topics
- Glossary of commutative algebra
- Combinatorial commutative algebra
- Gröbner basis
- Homological algebra
