= Overring =

Mathematical concept

In mathematics, an overring of an integral domain contains the integral domain, and the integral domain's field of fractions contains the overring. Overrings provide an improved understanding of different types of rings and domains.

== Definition ==
In this article, all rings are commutative rings, and ring and overring share the same identity element.

Let $Q(A)$ represent the field of fractions of an integral domain $A$. Ring $B$ is an overring of integral domain $A$ if $A$ is a subring of $B$ and $B$ is a subring of the field of fractions $Q(A)$; the relationship is $A \subseteq B \subseteq Q(A)$.

== Properties ==
=== Ring of fractions ===
The rings $R_{A},S_{A},T_{A}$ are the rings of fractions of rings $R,S,T$ by multiplicative set $A$. Assume $T$ is an overring of $R$ and $A$ is a multiplicative set in $R$. The ring $T_{A}$ is an overring of $R_{A}$. The ring $T_{A}$ is the total ring of fractions of $R_{A}$ if every nonunit element of $T_{A}$ is a zero-divisor. Every overring of $R_{A}$ contained in $T_{A}$ is a ring $S_{A}$, and $S$ is an overring of $R$. Ring $R_{A}$ is integrally closed in $T_{A}$ if $R$ is integrally closed in $T$.

=== Noetherian domain ===
==== Definitions ====
A Noetherian ring satisfies the 3 equivalent finitenss conditions i) every ascending chain of ideals is finite, ii) every non-empty family of ideals has a maximal element and iii) every ideal has a finite basis.

An integral domain is a Dedekind domain if every ideal of the domain is a finite product of prime ideals.

A ring's restricted dimension is the maximum rank among the ranks of all prime ideals that contain a regular element.

A ring $R$ is locally nilpotentfree if every ring $R_{M}$ with maximal ideal $M$ is free of nilpotent elements or a ring with every nonunit a zero divisor.

An affine ring is the homomorphic image of a polynomial ring (a finitely generated algebra) over a field.

==== Properties ====
Every overring of a Dedekind ring is a Dedekind ring.

Every overrring of a direct sum of rings whose non-unit elements are all zero-divisors is a Noetherian ring.

Every overring of a Krull 1-dimensional Noetherian domain is a Noetherian ring.

These statements are equivalent for Noetherian ring $R$ with integral closure $\bar{R}$.

- Every overring of $R$ is a Noetherian ring.
- For each maximal ideal $M$ of $R$, every overring of $R_{M}$ is a Noetherian ring.
- Ring $R$ is locally nilpotentfree with restricted dimension 1 or less.
- Ring $\bar{R}$ is Noetherian, and ring $R$ has restricted dimension 1 or less.
- Every overring of $\bar{R}$ is integrally closed.

These statements are equivalent for affine ring $R$ with integral closure $\bar{R}$.

- Ring $R$ is locally nilpotentfree.
- Ring $\bar{R}$ is a finite $R$-module.
- Ring $\bar{R}$ is Noetherian.

An integrally closed local ring $R$ is an integral domain or a ring whose non-unit elements are all zero-divisors.

A Noetherian integral domain is a Dedekind ring if every overring of the Noetherian ring is integrally closed.

Every overring of a Noetherian integral domain is a ring of fractions if the Noetherian integral domain is a Dedekind ring with a torsion class group.

=== Coherent rings ===
==== Definitions ====
A coherent ring is a commutative ring with each finitely generated ideal finitely presented. Noetherian domains and Prüfer domains are coherent.

A pair $(R,T)$ indicates an integral domain extension of $T$ over $R$.

Ring $S$ is an intermediate domain for pair $(R,T)$ if $R$ is a subdomain of $S$ and $S$ is a subdomain of $T$.

==== Properties ====
A Noetherian ring's Krull dimension is 1 or less if every overring is coherent.

For integral domain pair $(R,T)$, $T$ is an overring of $R$ if each intermediate integral domain is integrally closed in $T$.

The integral closure of $R$ is a Prüfer domain if each proper overring of $R$ is coherent.

The overrings of Prüfer domains and Krull 1-dimensional Noetherian domains are coherent.

=== Prüfer domains ===
==== Properties ====
A ring has QR property if every overring is a localization with a multiplicative set. The QR domains are Prüfer domains. A Prüfer domain with a torsion Picard group is a QR domain. A Prüfer domain is a QR domain if the radical of every finitely generated ideal equals the radical generated by a principal ideal.

The statement $R$ is a Prüfer domain is equivalent to:

- Each overring of $R$ is the intersection of localizations of $R$, and $R$ is integrally closed.
- Each overring of $R$ is the intersection of rings of fractions of $R$, and $R$ is integrally closed.
- Each overring of $R$ has prime ideals that are extensions of the prime ideals of $R$, and $R$ is integrally closed.
- Each overring of $R$ has at most 1 prime ideal lying over any prime ideal of $R$, and $R$ is integrally closed
- Each overring of $R$ is integrally closed.
- Each overring of $R$ is coherent.

The statement $R$ is a Prüfer domain is equivalent to:

- Each overring $S$ of $R$ is flat as a $S$-module.
- Each valuation overring of $R$ is a ring of fractions.

=== Minimal overring ===
==== Definitions ====
A minimal ring homomorphism $f$ is an injective non-surjective homomorophism, and if the homomorphism $f$ is a composition of homomorphisms $g$ and $h$ then $g$ or $h$ is an isomorphism.

A proper minimal ring extension $T$ of subring $R$ occurs if the ring inclusion of $R$ in to $T$ is a minimal ring homomorphism. This implies the ring pair $(R,T)$ has no proper intermediate ring.

A minimal overring $T$ of ring $R$ occurs if $T$ contains $R$ as a subring, and the ring pair $(R,T)$ has no proper intermediate ring.

The Kaplansky ideal transform (Hayes transform, S-transform) of ideal $I$ with respect to integral domain $R$ is a subset of the fraction field $Q(R)$. This subset contains elements $x$ such that for each element $y$ of the ideal $I$ there is a positive integer $n$ with the product $x \cdot y^{n}$ contained in integral domain $R$.

==== Properties ====
Any domain generated from a minimal ring extension of domain $R$ is an overring of $R$ if $R$ is not a field.

The field of fractions of $R$ contains minimal overring $T$ of $R$ when $R$ is not a field.

Assume an integrally closed integral domain $R$ is not a field, If a minimal overring of integral domain $R$ exists, this minimal overring occurs as the Kaplansky transform of a maximal ideal of $R$.

== Examples ==
The Bézout integral domain is a type of Prüfer domain; the Bézout domain's defining property is every finitely generated ideal is a principal ideal. The Bézout domain will share all the overring properties of a Prüfer domain.

The integer ring is a Prüfer ring, and all overrings are rings of quotients. The dyadic rational is a fraction with an integer numerator and power of 2 denominators. The dyadic rational ring is the localization of the integers by powers of two and an overring of the integer ring.

== See also ==
- Category of rings – Category whose objects are rings and whose morphisms are ring homomorphisms
- Glossary of ring theory
- Localization (commutative algebra)
- Subring – Subset of a ring that forms a ring itself
- Total ring of fractions – Construction within abstract algebra
