= Prüfer domain =

In mathematics, a Prüfer domain is a type of commutative ring that generalizes Dedekind domains in a non-Noetherian context. These rings possess the nice ideal- and module-theoretic properties of Dedekind domains, but usually only for finitely generated modules. Prüfer domains are named after the German mathematician Heinz Prüfer.

== Examples ==
The ring of entire functions on the open complex plane is a Prüfer domain. The ring of integer valued polynomials with rational coefficients is a Prüfer domain, although the ring $\Z[X]$ of integer polynomials is not. While every number ring is a Dedekind domain, their union, the ring of algebraic integers, is a Prüfer domain. Just as a Dedekind domain is locally a discrete valuation ring, a Prüfer domain is locally a valuation ring, so that Prüfer domains act as non-Noetherian analogues of Dedekind domains. Indeed, a domain that is a direct limit of its subrings that are Prüfer domains is a Prüfer domain.

Many Prüfer domains are also Bézout domains: not only are finitely generated ideals projective, they are even free (that is, principal). For instance, the ring of analytic functions on any non-compact Riemann surface is a Bézout domain, and the ring of algebraic integers is Bézout.

== Definitions ==
A Prüfer domain is a semihereditary integral domain. Equivalently, a Prüfer domain may be defined as a commutative ring without zero divisors in which every non-zero finitely generated ideal is invertible. Many different characterizations of Prüfer domains are known.

As a sample, the following conditions on an integral domain R are equivalent to R being a Prüfer domain, i.e. every finitely generated ideal of R is projective:

Ideal arithmetic

- Every non-zero finitely generated ideal I of R is invertible: i.e. I ⋅ I^{−1} = R, where $I^{-1} = \{r\in q(R): rI\subseteq R\}$ and q(R) is the field of fractions of R. Equivalently, every non-zero ideal generated by two elements is invertible.
- For any (finitely generated) non-zero ideals I, J, K of R, the following distributivity property holds:
  $I \cap (J + K) = (I \cap J) + (I \cap K).$
- For any (finitely generated) ideals I, J, K of R, the following distributivity property holds:
  $I(J \cap K)=IJ \cap IK.$
- For any (finitely generated) non-zero ideals I, J of R, the following property holds:
  $(I+J)(I \cap J) = IJ.$
- For any finitely generated ideals I, J, K of R, if IJ = IK then J = K or I = 0.

Localizations

- For every prime ideal P of R, the localization R_{P} of R at P is a valuation domain.
- For every maximal ideal m in R, the localization R_{m} of R at m is a valuation domain.
- R is integrally closed and every overring of R (that is, a ring contained between R and its field of fractions) is the intersection of localizations of R.

Flatness

- Every torsion-free R-module is flat.
- Every torsionless R-module is flat.
- Every ideal of R is flat.
- Every overring of R is R-flat.
- Every submodule of a flat R-module is flat.
- If M and N are torsion-free R-modules then their tensor product M ⊗_{R} N is torsion-free.
- If I and J are two ideals of R then I ⊗_{R} J is torsion-free.
- The torsion submodule of every finitely generated module is a direct summand (Kaplansky 1960).

Integral closure

- Every overring of R is integrally closed.
- R is integrally closed and there is some positive integer n such that for every a, b in R one has (a, b)^{n} = (a^{n}, b^{n}).
- $R$ is integrally closed and each element of the quotient field K of R is a root of a polynomial in R[x] whose coefficients generate R as an R-module (Gilmer & Hoffmann 1975, p. 81).

== Properties ==
- A commutative ring is a Dedekind domain if and only if it is a Prüfer domain and Noetherian.
- Though Prüfer domains need not be Noetherian, they must be coherent, since finitely generated projective modules are finitely related.
- Though ideals of Dedekind domains can all be generated by two elements, for every positive integer n, there are Prüfer domains with finitely generated ideals that cannot be generated by fewer than n elements. However, finitely generated maximal ideals of Prüfer domains are two-generated.
- If R is a Prüfer domain and K is its field of fractions, then any ring S such that R ⊆ S ⊆ K is a Prüfer domain.
- If R is a Prüfer domain, K is its field of fractions, and L is an algebraic extension field of K, then the integral closure of R in L is a Prüfer domain.
- A finitely generated module M over a Prüfer domain is projective if and only if it is torsion-free. In fact, this property characterizes Prüfer domains.
- (Gilmer–Hoffmann Theorem) Suppose that $R$ is an integral domain, $K$ its field of fractions, and $S$ is the integral closure of $R$ in $K$. Then $S$ is a Prüfer domain if and only if every element of $K$ is a root of a polynomial in $R[X]$ at least one of whose coefficients is a unit of $R$.
- A commutative domain is a Dedekind domain if and only if the torsion submodule is a direct summand whenever it is bounded (M is bounded means rM = 0 for some r in R). Similarly, a commutative domain is a Prüfer domain if and only if the torsion submodule is a direct summand whenever it is finitely generated.

== Generalizations ==
More generally, a Prüfer ring is a commutative ring in which every non-zero finitely generated ideal containing a non-zero-divisor is invertible (that is, projective).

A commutative ring is said to be arithmetical if for every maximal ideal m in R, the localization R_{m} of R at m is a chain ring. With this definition, a Prüfer domain is an arithmetical domain. In fact, an arithmetical domain is the same thing as a Prüfer domain.

Non-commutative right or left semihereditary domains could also be considered as generalizations of Prüfer domains.

== See also ==
- Divided domain
