= Torsionless module =

In abstract algebra, a module M over a ring R is called torsionless if it can be embedded into some direct product R^{I}. Equivalently, M is torsionless if each non-zero element of M has non-zero image under some R-linear functional f:

$$f\in M^{\ast}=\operatorname{Hom}_R(M,R),\quad f(m)\ne 0.$$

This notion was introduced by Hyman Bass.

== Properties and examples ==
A module is torsionless if and only if the canonical map into its double dual,

$$M\to M^{\ast\ast}=\operatorname{Hom}_R(M^{\ast},R), \quad
m\mapsto (f\mapsto f(m)), m\in M, f\in M^{\ast},$$

is injective. If this map is bijective then the module is called reflexive. For this reason, torsionless modules are also known as semi-reflexive.

- A unital free module is torsionless. More generally, a direct sum of torsionless modules is torsionless.
- A free module is reflexive if it is finitely generated, and for some rings there are also infinitely generated free modules that are reflexive. For instance, the direct sum of countably many copies of the integers is a reflexive module over the integers, see for instance.
- A submodule of a torsionless module is torsionless. In particular, any projective module over R is torsionless; any left ideal of R is a torsionless left module, and similarly for the right ideals.
- Any torsionless module over a domain is a torsion-free module, but the converse is not true, as Q is a torsion-free Z-module that is not torsionless.
- If R is a commutative ring that is an integral domain and M is a finitely generated torsion-free module then M can be embedded into R^{n}, and hence M is torsionless.
- Suppose that N is a right R-module, then its dual N^{∗} has a structure of a left R-module. It turns out that any left R-module arising in this way is torsionless (similarly, any right R-module that is a dual of a left R-module is torsionless).
- Over a Dedekind domain, a finitely generated module is reflexive if and only if it is torsion-free.
- Let R be a Noetherian ring and M a reflexive finitely generated module over R. Then $M \otimes_R S$ is a reflexive module over S whenever S is flat over R.

== Relation with semihereditary rings ==
Stephen Chase proved the following characterization of semihereditary rings in connection with torsionless modules:

For any ring R, the following conditions are equivalent:

- R is left semihereditary.
- All torsionless right R-modules are flat.
- The ring R is left coherent and satisfies any of the four conditions that are known to be equivalent:
  - All right ideals of R are flat.
  - All left ideals of R are flat.
  - Submodules of all right flat R-modules are flat.
  - Submodules of all left flat R-modules are flat.

(The mixture of left/right adjectives in the statement is not a mistake.)

== See also ==
- Prüfer domain
- reflexive sheaf
