= Øystein Ore =

Norwegian mathematician (1899–1968)

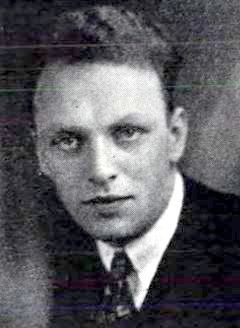
- Øystein Ore (c. 1933)
- Born: 7 October 1899; Oslo, Norway
- Died: 13 August 1968 (aged 68); Oslo, Norway
- Education: University of Oslo
- Known for: Noncommutative rings Lattice theory
- Scientific career
- Fields: Mathematician
- Workplaces: Oslo University; Yale University
- Doctoral advisor: Thoralf Skolem
- Doctoral students: Miriam Becker; Marshall Hall, Jr.; Grace Hopper; Bruce Lee Rothschild; Melvin Dresher

Øystein Ore (7 October 1899 – 13 August 1968) was a Norwegian mathematician known for his work in ring theory, Galois connections, graph theory, and the history of mathematics.

== Life ==
Ore graduated from the University of Oslo in 1922, with a Cand.Real.degree in mathematics. In 1924, the University of Oslo awarded him the Ph.D. for a thesis titled Zur Theorie der algebraischen Körper, supervised by Thoralf Skolem. Ore also studied at Göttingen University, where he learned Emmy Noether's new approach to abstract algebra. He was also a fellow at the Mittag-Leffler Institute in Sweden, and spent some time at the University of Paris. In 1925, he was appointed research assistant at the University of Oslo.

Yale University’s James Pierpont went to Europe in 1926 to recruit research mathematicians. In 1927, Yale hired Ore as an assistant professor of mathematics, promoted him to associate professor in 1928, then to full professor in 1929. In 1931, he became a Sterling Professor (Yale's highest academic rank), a position he held until he retired in 1968.

Ore gave an American Mathematical Society Colloquium lecture in 1941 and was a plenary speaker at the International Congress of Mathematicians in 1936 in Oslo. He was also elected to the American Academy of Arts and Sciences and the Oslo Academy of Science. He was a founder of the Econometric Society.

Ore visited Norway nearly every summer. During World War II, he was active in the "American Relief for Norway" and "Free Norway" movements. In gratitude for the services rendered to his native country during the war, he was decorated in 1947 with the Order of St. Olav.

In 1930, Ore married Gudrun Lundevall. They had two children. Ore had a passion for painting and sculpture, collected ancient maps, and spoke several languages.

== Work ==
Ore is known for his work in ring theory, Galois connections, and most of all, graph theory.

His early work was on algebraic number fields, how to decompose the ideal generated by a prime number into prime ideals. He then worked on noncommutative rings, proving his celebrated theorem on embedding a domain into a division ring. He then examined polynomial rings over skew fields, and attempted to extend his work on factorisation to non-commutative rings. The Ore condition, which (if true) allows a ring of fractions to be defined, and the Ore extension, a non-commutative analogue of rings of polynomials, are part of this work. In more elementary number theory, Ore's harmonic numbers are the numbers whose divisors have an integer harmonic mean.

As a teacher, Ore is notable for supervising two doctoral students who would make contributions to science and mathematics: Grace Hopper, who eventually became a United States rear admiral and computer scientist and who was a pioneer in developing the first computers, and Marshall Hall, Jr., an American mathematician who did important research in group theory and combinatorics.

In 1930, the Collected Works of Richard Dedekind were published in three volumes, jointly edited by Ore and Emmy Noether. He then turned his attention to lattice theory becoming, together with Garrett Birkhoff, one of the two founders of American expertise in the subject. Ore's early work on lattice theory led him to the study of equivalence and closure relations, Galois connections, and finally to graph theory, which occupied him to the end of his life. He wrote two books on the subject, one on the theory of graphs and another on their applications. Within graph theory, Ore's theorem is one of several results proving that sufficiently dense graphs contain Hamiltonian cycles.

Ore had a lively interest in the history of mathematics, and was an unusually able author of books for laypeople, such as his biographies of Cardano and Niels Henrik Abel.

== Books by Ore ==
- Les Corps Algébriques et la Théorie des Idéaux (1934)
- L'Algèbre Abstraite (1936)
- Number Theory and its History (1948)
- Cardano, the Gambling Scholar (Princeton University Press, 1953)
- Niels Henrik Abel, Mathematician Extraordinary (U. of Minnesota Press, 1957)
- Theory of Graphs (1962)
- Graphs and Their Uses (1963)
- The Four-Color Problem (1967)
- Invitation to Number Theory (1969)

== Articles by Ore ==
- "On the foundation of abstract algebra (1)". Ann. of Math. 36 (2): 406–406. Apr 1935. doi:10.2307/1968580. JSTOR 1968580.
- "On the foundation of abstract algebra (2)". Ann. of Math. 37 (2): 265–292. Apr 1936. doi:10.2307/1968442. JSTOR 1968442.
- "Structures and group theory (1)". Duke Math. J. 3 (2): 149–174. Jun 1937. doi:10.1215/S0012-7094-37-00311-9.
- "Structures and group theory (2)". Duke Math. J. 4 (2): 247–269. Jun 1938. doi:10.1215/S0012-7094-38-00419-3.
- "Remarks on structures and group relations". Vierteljschr. Naturforsch. Ges. Zürich, Beiblatt Festschrift Rudolf Fueter. 85: 1–4. 1940.
- "Theory of equivalence relations". Duke Math. J. 9 (3): 573–627. Sep 1942. doi:10.1215/S0012-7094-42-00942-6.
- "Chains in partially ordered sets". Bull. Amer. Math. Soc. 49 (8): 558–566. 1943. doi:10.1090/S0002-9904-1943-07970-0.
- "Combinations of Closure Relations". Ann. of Math. 44 (3): 514–533. Jul 1943. doi:10.2307/1968978. JSTOR 1968978.
- "Galois connexions". Trans. Amer. Math. Soc. 55: 493–513. 1944. doi:10.1090/S0002-9947-1944-0010555-7.

== See also ==
- Deficiency (graph theory)
- Geodetic graph
- Magma (algebra)
- Ore algebra
- Ore condition
- Ore's conjecture
- Ore extension
- Ore number
- Ore's theorem
- Schwartz–Zippel lemma
- Universal algebra
