= Irreducible ring =

In mathematics, especially in the field of ring theory, the term irreducible ring is used in a few different ways.

- A (meet-)irreducible ring is a ring in which the intersection of two non-zero ideals is always non-zero.
- A directly irreducible ring is a ring which cannot be written as the direct sum of two non-zero rings.
- A subdirectly irreducible ring is a ring with a unique, non-zero minimum two-sided ideal.
- A ring with an irreducible spectrum is a ring whose spectrum is irreducible as a topological space.

"Meet-irreducible" rings are referred to as "irreducible rings" in commutative algebra. This article adopts the term "meet-irreducible" in order to distinguish between the several types being discussed.

Meet-irreducible rings play an important part in commutative algebra, and directly irreducible and subdirectly irreducible rings play a role in the general theory of structure for rings. Subdirectly irreducible algebras have also found use in number theory.

This article follows the convention that rings have multiplicative identity, but are not necessarily commutative.

== Definitions ==
The terms "meet-reducible", "directly reducible" and "subdirectly reducible" are used when a ring is not meet-irreducible, or not directly irreducible, or not subdirectly irreducible, respectively.

The following conditions are equivalent for a commutative ring R:

- R is meet-irreducible;
- the zero ideal in R is irreducible, i.e. the intersection of two non-zero ideals of A always is non-zero.

The following conditions are equivalent for a ring R:

- R is directly irreducible;
- R has no central idempotents except for 0 and 1.

The following conditions are equivalent for a ring R:

- R is subdirectly irreducible;
- when R is written as a subdirect product of rings, then one of the projections of R onto a ring in the subdirect product is an isomorphism;
- The intersection of all non-zero ideals of R is non-zero.

The following conditions are equivalent for a commutative ring R:

- the spectrum of R is irreducible.
- R possesses exactly one minimal prime ideal (this prime ideal may be the zero ideal).

== Examples and properties ==
If R is subdirectly irreducible or meet-irreducible, then it is also directly irreducible, but the converses are not true.

- All integral domains are meet-irreducible, but not all integral domains are subdirectly irreducible (e.g. Z). In fact, a commutative ring is a domain if and only if it is both meet-irreducible and reduced.
- A commutative ring is a domain if and only if its spectrum is irreducible and it is reduced.
- The quotient ring Z/4Z is a ring which has all three senses of irreducibility, but it is not a domain. Its only proper ideal is 2Z/4Z, which is maximal, hence prime. The ideal is also minimal.
- The direct product of two non-zero rings is never directly irreducible, and hence is never meet-irreducible or subdirectly irreducible. For example, in Z × Z the intersection of the non-zero ideals {0} × Z and Z × {0} is equal to the zero ideal {0} × {0}.
- Commutative directly irreducible rings are connected rings; that is, their only idempotent elements are 0 and 1.

== Generalizations ==
Commutative meet-irreducible rings play an elementary role in algebraic geometry, where this concept is generalized to the concept of an irreducible scheme.
