= Divided domain =

In algebra, a divided domain is an integral domain R in which every prime ideal $\mathfrak{p}$ satisfies $\mathfrak{p} = \mathfrak{p} R_\mathfrak{p}$. A locally divided domain is an integral domain that is a divided domain at every maximal ideal. A Prüfer domain is a basic example of a locally divided domain. Divided domains were introduced by Akiba (1967) who called them AV-domains.
