= Divisor (disambiguation) =

A divisor is the second operand of a division. A divisor may also refer to

- Divisor (number theory), an integer that divides evenly another integer
- Divisor (ring theory), a generalization of the preceding concept
- Divisor (algebraic geometry), a generalization of codimension one subvarieties of algebraic varieties
