= Eléna Wexler-Kreindler =

Romanian mathematician

Eléna Wexler-Kreindler (15 October 1931 – August 1992) was a Romanian mathematician. She spent most of her professional career in France, where she specialized in modern algebra and studied the Ore extensions, the theory of the filtration of rings, or algebraic microlocalisation.

== Career ==
Kreindler was born on 15 October 1931 in Brăila, Romania into a Jewish family. She obtained in 1951 a fellowship and spent the next four years in the USSR studying mathematics at the Ural State University, located in Sverdlovsk (nowadays Yekaterinburg). In 1955, she completed a master thesis on "Multiplicative Lattices with Additive Basis" under the supervision of Petr Grigor'evich Kontorovich, before returning to Bucharest to join the faculty of Mathematics at the Polytechnic Institute of Bucharest. Next to her duties as assistant professor, she continued with her research in the field of functional analysis under the guidance of Grigore Moisil. She earned her Ph.D. thesis in mathematics on the "Theory of Pseudolinear Operators". In 1969 she was promoted to associate professor. Kreindler married fellow mathematician Dinu Wexler and changed her name to Eléna Wexler-Kreindler. She left Romania with her husband in 1972 to move to France.

She had to start a new professional career in Paris, first as untenured and later tenured associate professor at the Pierre and Marie Curie University. She was eventually promoted to associate professor in 1989. Her work in France was dedicated to the study of problems in modern algebra, such as the Ore extensions, the theory of the filtration of rings, or algebraic microlocalisation. She published with Marie José Bertin a collection of solved problems of algebra and a companion to the book of Marie Paule Maliaving "Algèbre commutative: applications en géométrie et théorie des nombres".
