= Arithmetical ring =

In commutative algebra, a ring $R$ is said to be arithmetical (or arithmetic) if any of the following equivalent conditions hold:

1. The localization $R_\mathfrak{m}$ of $R$ at $\mathfrak{m}$ is a uniserial ring for every maximal ideal $\mathfrak{m}$ of $R$.
2. For all ideals $\mathfrak{a}, \mathfrak{b}$, and $\mathfrak{c}$,
  $$\mathfrak{a} \cap (\mathfrak{b} + \mathfrak{c}) = (\mathfrak{a} \cap \mathfrak{b}) + (\mathfrak{a} \cap \mathfrak{c})$$
3. For all ideals $\mathfrak{a}, \mathfrak{b}$, and $\mathfrak{c}$,
  $$\mathfrak{a} + (\mathfrak{b} \cap \mathfrak{c}) = (\mathfrak{a} + \mathfrak{b}) \cap (\mathfrak{a} + \mathfrak{c})$$

The last two conditions both say that the lattice of all ideals of $R$ is distributive.

An arithmetical domain is the same thing as a Prüfer domain.
