= Prime avoidance lemma =

Result concerning ideals of commutative rings

In algebra, the prime avoidance lemma says that if an ideal I in a commutative ring R is contained in a union of finitely many prime ideals P_{i}'s, then it is contained in P_{i} for some i.

There are many variations of the lemma (cf. Hochster); for example, if the ring R contains an infinite field or a finite field of sufficiently large cardinality, then the statement follows from a fact in linear algebra that a vector space over an infinite field or a finite field of large cardinality is not a finite union of its proper vector subspaces.

== Statement and proof ==
The following statement and argument are perhaps the most standard.

Theorem (Prime Avoidance Lemma): Let E be a subset of commutative ring R that is an additive subgroup of R and is multiplicatively closed. (In particular, E could be a subring or ideal of R.) Let $I_1, I_2, \dots, I_n, n \ge 1$ be ideals such that $I_i$ are prime ideals for $i \ge 3$. If E is not contained in any of the $I_i$, then E is not contained in the union $\bigcup I_i$.

Proof by induction on n: The idea is to find an element of R that is in E and not in any of the $I_i$. The base case $n=1$ is trivial. Next suppose $n\geq 2$. For each i, choose

$$z_i \in E \setminus \bigcup_{j \ne i} I_j$$,

where each of the sets on the right is nonempty by the inductive hypothesis. We can assume $z_i \in I_i$ for all i; otherwise, there is some $z_k$ among them that avoids all of the $I_i$, and we are done. Put

$$z = z_1 \cdots z_{n-1} + z_n$$.

Because E is closed under addition and multiplication, z is in E by construction. We claim that z is not in any of the $I_i$. Indeed, if $z\in I_i$ for some $i \le n - 1$, then $z_n\in I_i$, a contradiction. Next suppose $z\in I_n$. Then $z_1 \cdots z_{n-1} \in I_n$. If $n=2$, this is already a contradiction. If $n>2$, then, since $I_n$ is a prime ideal, $z_i\in I_n$ for some $i\leq n-1$, again a contradiction. $\square$

== E. Davis' prime avoidance ==
There is the following variant of prime avoidance due to E. Davis.

Theorem— Let A be a ring, $\mathfrak{p}_1, \dots, \mathfrak{p}_r$ prime ideals, x an element of A and J an ideal. For the ideal $I = xA + J$, if $I \not\subset \mathfrak{p}_i$ for each i, then there exists some y in J such that $x + y \not\in \mathfrak{p}_i$ for each i.

Proof: We argue by induction on r. Without loss of generality, we can assume there is no inclusion relation between the $\mathfrak{p}_i$'s; since otherwise we can use the inductive hypothesis.

Also, if $x \not\in \mathfrak{p}_i$ for each i, then we are done; thus, without loss of generality, we can assume $x \in \mathfrak{p}_r$. By inductive hypothesis, we find a y in J such that $x + y \in I - \cup_1^{r-1} \mathfrak{p}_i$. If $x + y$ is not in $\mathfrak{p}_r$, we are done. Otherwise, note that $J \not\subset \mathfrak{p}_r$ (since $x \in \mathfrak{p}_r$) and since $\mathfrak{p}_r$ is a prime ideal, we have:

$$\mathfrak{p}_r \not\supset J \, \mathfrak{p}_1 \cdots \mathfrak{p}_{r-1}$$.

Hence, we can choose $y'$ in $J \, \mathfrak{p}_1 \cdots \mathfrak{p}_{r-1}$ that is not in $\mathfrak{p}_r$. Then, since $x + y \in \mathfrak{p}_r$, the element $x + y + y'$ has the required property. $\square$

=== Application ===
Let A be a Noetherian ring, I an ideal generated by n elements and M a finite A-module such that $IM \ne M$. Also, let $d = \operatorname{depth}_A(I, M)$ = the maximal length of M-regular sequences in I = the length of every maximal M-regular sequence in I. Then $d \le n$; this estimate can be shown using the above prime avoidance as follows. We argue by induction on n. Let $\{ \mathfrak{p}_1, \dots, \mathfrak{p}_r \}$ be the set of associated primes of M. If $d > 0$, then $I \not\subset \mathfrak{p}_i$ for each i. If $I = (y_1, \dots, y_n)$, then, by prime avoidance, we can choose

$$x_1 = y_1 + \sum_{i = 2}^n a_i y_i$$

for some $a_i$ in $A$ such that $x_1 \not\in \cup_1^r \mathfrak{p}_i$ = the set of zero divisors on M. Now, $I/(x_1)$ is an ideal of $A/(x_1)$ generated by $n - 1$ elements and so, by inductive hypothesis, $\operatorname{depth}_{A/(x_1)}(I/(x_1), M/x_1M) \le n - 1$. The claim now follows.
