= Kasch =

Kasch is a surname. Notable people with the surname include:

- Andrew Kasch, American film director and editor
- Cody Kasch (born 1987), American actor
- Friedrich Kasch (1921–2017), mathematician, named for Kasch ring
- Max Kasch (born 1985), American actor
