= Minimal ideal =

In the branch of abstract algebra known as ring theory, a minimal right ideal of a ring R is a non-zero right ideal which contains no other non-zero right ideal. Likewise, a minimal left ideal is a non-zero left ideal of R containing no other non-zero left ideals of R, and a minimal ideal of R is a non-zero ideal containing no other non-zero two-sided ideal of R (Isaacs 2009, p. 190).

In other words, minimal right ideals are minimal elements of the partially ordered set (poset) of non-zero right ideals of R ordered by inclusion. The reader is cautioned that outside of this context, some posets of ideals may admit the zero ideal, and so the zero ideal could potentially be a minimal element in that poset. This is the case for the poset of prime ideals of a ring, which may include the zero ideal as a minimal prime ideal.

== Definition ==
The definition of a minimal right ideal N of a ring R is equivalent to the following conditions:

- N is non-zero and if K is a right ideal of R with {0} ⊆ K ⊆ N, then either K = {0} or K = N.
- N is a simple right R-module.

Minimal ideals are the dual notion to maximal ideals.

== Properties ==
Many standard facts on minimal ideals can be found in standard texts such as (Anderson & Fuller 1992), (Isaacs 2009), (Lam 2001), and (Lam 1999).

- In a ring with unity, maximal right ideals always exist. In contrast, minimal right, left, or two-sided ideals in a ring with unity need not exist.
- The right socle of a ring $\mathrm{soc}(R_R)$ is an important structure defined in terms of the minimal right ideals of R.
- Rings for which every right ideal contains a minimal right ideal are exactly the rings with an essential right socle.
- Any right Artinian ring or right Kasch ring has a minimal right ideal.
- Domains that are not division rings have no minimal right ideals.
- In rings with unity, minimal right ideals are necessarily principal right ideals, because for any nonzero x in a minimal right ideal N, the set xR is a nonzero right ideal of R inside N, and so xR = N.
- Brauer's lemma: Any minimal right ideal N in a ring R satisfies N^{2} = {0} or N = eR for some idempotent element e of R (Lam 2001, p. 162).
- If N_{1} and N_{2} are non-isomorphic minimal right ideals of R, then the product N_{1}N_{2} equals {0}.
- If N_{1} and N_{2} are distinct minimal ideals of a ring R, then N_{1}N_{2} = {0}.
- A simple ring with a minimal right ideal is a semisimple ring.
- In a semiprime ring, there exists a minimal right ideal if and only if there exists a minimal left ideal (Lam 2001, p. 174).

== Generalization ==
A non-zero submodule N of a right module M is called a minimal submodule if it contains no other non-zero submodules of M. Equivalently, N is a non-zero submodule of M which is a simple module. This can also be extended to bimodules by calling a non-zero sub-bimodule N a minimal sub-bimodule of M if N contains no other non-zero sub-bimodules.

If the module M is taken to be the right R-module R_{R}, then the minimal submodules are exactly the minimal right ideals of R. Likewise, the minimal left ideals of R are precisely the minimal submodules of the left module _{R}R. In the case of two-sided ideals, we see that the minimal ideals of R are exactly the minimal sub-bimodules of the bimodule _{R}R_{R}.

Just as with rings, there is no guarantee that minimal submodules exist in a module. Minimal submodules can be used to define the socle of a module.
