= Zero-product property =

The product of two nonzero elements is nonzero

A zero product equation with three solutions

In algebra, the zero-product property states that the product of two nonzero elements is nonzero. In other words, $\text{if }ab=0,\text{ then }a=0\text{ or }b=0.$

This property is also known as the rule of zero product, the null factor law, the multiplication property of zero, the nonexistence of nonzero zero divisors, or one of the two zero-factor properties. All of the number systems studied in elementary mathematics — the integers $\Z$, the rational numbers $\Q$, the real numbers $\Reals$, and the complex numbers $\Complex$ — satisfy the zero-product property. In general, a ring which satisfies the zero-product property is called a domain.

== Algebraic context ==
In order for the question of whether or not an algebraic structure $A$ has the zero-product property to be meaningful, $A$ must have both additive structure and multiplicative structure. Usually one assumes that $A$ is a ring, though it could be something else, e.g. the set of nonnegative integers $\{ 0, 1, 2, \ldots \}$ with ordinary addition and multiplication, which is only a (commutative) semiring.

Note that if $A$ satisfies the zero-product property, and if $B$ is a subset of $A$, then $B$ also satisfies the zero product property: if $a$ and $b$ are elements of $B$ such that $ab = 0$, then either $a = 0$ or $b = 0$ because $a$ and $b$ can also be considered as elements of $A$.

== Examples ==
- A ring in which the zero-product property holds is called a domain. A commutative domain is called an integral domain. Every field and every subring of a field are integral domains. Similarly, every subring of a division ring is a domain and satisfies the zero-product property.
- If $p$ is a prime number, then the ring of integers modulo $p$ has the zero-product property (in fact, it is a field).
- The Gaussian integers are an integral domain because they are a subring of the complex numbers.
- The zero-product property holds in the quaternions, since the quaternions form a division ring.
- The set of nonnegative integers $\{0,1,2,\ldots\}$ satisfies the zero-product property, as being a subset of the integers, which form an integral domain.

== Non-examples ==
- Let $\Z_n$ denote the ring of integers modulo $n$. Then $\Z_6$ does not satisfy the zero product property: 2 and 3 are nonzero elements, yet $2 \cdot 3 \equiv 0 \pmod{6}$.
- In general, if $n$ is a composite number, then $\Z_n$ does not satisfy the zero-product property. Namely, if $n = qm$ where $0 < q,m < n$, then $m$ and $q$ are nonzero modulo $n$, yet $qm \equiv 0 \pmod{n}$.
- The ring of 2×2 matrices with integer entries does not satisfy the zero-product property: if
  $$M = \begin{pmatrix}1 & -1 \\ 0 & 0\end{pmatrix}$$
  and
  $$N = \begin{pmatrix}0 & 1 \\ 0 & 1\end{pmatrix},$$
  then
  $$MN = \begin{pmatrix}1 & -1 \\ 0 & 0\end{pmatrix} \begin{pmatrix}0 & 1 \\ 0 & 1\end{pmatrix} = \begin{pmatrix}0 & 0 \\ 0 & 0\end{pmatrix} = 0,$$
  yet neither $M$ nor $N$ is zero.
- The ring of all functions $f: [0,1] \to \R$, from the unit interval to the real numbers, has nontrivial zero divisors: there are pairs of functions which are not identically equal to zero yet whose product is the zero function. In fact, it is not hard to construct, for any n ≥ 2, functions $f_1,\ldots,f_n$, none of which is identically zero, such that $f_i \, f_j$ is identically zero whenever $i \neq j$.
- The same is true even if we consider only continuous functions, or only even infinitely smooth functions. On the other hand, analytic functions have the zero-product property.

== Application to finding roots of polynomials ==
Suppose $P$ and $Q$ are univariate polynomials with real coefficients, and $x$ is a real number such that $P(x)Q(x) = 0$. (Actually, we may allow the coefficients and $x$ to come from any integral domain.) By the zero-product property, it follows that either $P(x) = 0$ or $Q(x) = 0$. In other words, the roots of $PQ$ are precisely the roots of $P$ together with the roots of $Q$.

Thus, one can use factorization to find the roots of a polynomial. For example, the polynomial $x^3 - 2x^2 - 5x + 6$ factorizes as $(x-3)(x-1)(x+2)$; hence, its roots are precisely 3, 1, and −2.

In general, suppose $R$ is an integral domain and $f$ is a monic univariate polynomial of degree $d \geq 1$ with coefficients in $R$. Suppose also that $f$ has $d$ distinct roots $r_1,\ldots,r_d \in R$. It follows (but we do not prove here) that $f$ factorizes as $f(x) = (x-r_1) \cdots (x-r_d)$. By the zero-product property, it follows that $r_1,\ldots,r_d$ are the only roots of $f$: any root of $f$ must be a root of $(x-r_i)$ for some $i$. In particular, $f$ has at most $d$ distinct roots.

If however $R$ is not an integral domain, then the conclusion need not hold. For example, the cubic polynomial $x^3 + 3x^2 + 2x$ has six roots in $\Z_6$ (though it has only three roots in $\Z$).

== More properties ==
In a ring or, more generally, in a rng (ring without multiplicative identity) $R$, the multiplication has the (left) cancellation property if, for every nonzero element $a\in R$ one has
$$ab=ac \implies b=c$$
for every $b\in R$ and $c\in R$. The distributive property $a(b-c)=ab-ac$ implies that a ring or rng has the zero product property if and only if its multiplication has the left cancellation.

If $R$ is a commutative ring or a commutative rng with the zero-product property, one can define fractions similarly as for the definition of rational number. These fractions form a field called the field of fractions of $R$.

It follows that a commutative ring or rng has the zero-product property is and only if it is a subring or sub-rng of a field.

== See also ==
- Fundamental theorem of algebra
- Prime ideal
