= Connected ring =

In mathematics, especially in the field of commutative algebra, a connected ring is a commutative ring A that satisfies one of the following equivalent conditions:

- A possesses no non-trivial (that is, not equal to 1 or 0) idempotent elements;
- the spectrum of A with the Zariski topology is a connected space.

== Examples and non-examples ==
Connectedness defines a fairly general class of commutative rings. For example, all local rings and all (meet-)irreducible rings are connected. In particular, all integral domains are connected. Non-examples are given by product rings such as Z × Z; here the element (1, 0) is a non-trivial idempotent.

== Generalizations ==
In algebraic geometry, connectedness is generalized to the concept of a connected scheme.
