= Zero ring =

Unique ring consisting of one element

In ring theory, a branch of mathematics, the zero ring or trivial ring is the unique ring (up to isomorphism) consisting of one element. (Less commonly, the term "zero ring" is used to refer to any rng of square zero, i.e., a rng in which xy = 0 for all x and y. This article refers to the one-element ring.)

In the category of rings, the zero ring is the terminal object, whereas the ring of integers Z is the initial object.

== Definition ==
The zero ring, denoted {0} or simply 0, consists of the one-element set {0} with the operations + and · defined such that 0 + 0 = 0 and 0 · 0 = 0.

== Properties ==
- The zero ring is the unique ring in which the additive identity 0 and multiplicative identity 1 coincide. (Proof: If 1 = 0 in a ring R, then for all r in R, we have r = 1r = 0r = 0. The proof of the last equality is found here.)
- The zero ring is commutative.
- The element 0 in the zero ring is a unit, serving as its own multiplicative inverse.
- The unit group of the zero ring is the trivial group {0}.
- The element 0 in the zero ring is not a zero divisor.
- The only ideal in the zero ring is the zero ideal {0}, which is also the unit ideal, equal to the whole ring. This ideal is neither maximal nor prime.
- The zero ring is generally excluded from fields, while occasionally called as the trivial field. Excluding it agrees with the fact that its zero ideal is not maximal. (When mathematicians speak of the "field with one element", they are referring to a non-existent object, and their intention is to define the category that would be the category of schemes over this object if it existed.)
- The zero ring is generally excluded from integral domains. Whether the zero ring is considered to be a domain at all is a matter of convention, but there are two advantages to considering it not to be a domain. First, this agrees with the definition that a domain is a ring in which 0 is the only zero divisor (in particular, 0 is required to be a zero divisor, which fails in the zero ring). Second, this way, for a positive integer n, the ring Z/nZ is a domain if and only if n is prime, but 1 is not prime.
- For each ring A, there is a unique ring homomorphism from A to the zero ring. Thus the zero ring is a terminal object in the category of rings.
- If A is a nonzero ring, then there is no ring homomorphism from the zero ring to A. In particular, the zero ring is not a subring of any nonzero ring.
- The zero ring is the unique ring of characteristic 1.
- The only module for the zero ring is the zero module. It is free of rank א for any cardinal number א.
- The zero ring is not a local ring. It is, however, a semilocal ring.
- The zero ring is Artinian and (therefore) Noetherian.
- The spectrum of the zero ring is the empty scheme.
- The Krull dimension of the zero ring is −∞ (or −1 according to some conventions).
- The zero ring is semisimple but not simple.
- The zero ring is not a central simple algebra over any field.
- The total quotient ring of the zero ring is itself.

== Constructions ==
- For any ring A and ideal I of A, the quotient A/I is the zero ring if and only if I = A, i.e. if and only if I is the unit ideal.
- For any commutative ring A and multiplicative set S in A, the localization S^{−1}A is the zero ring if and only if S contains 0.
- If A is any ring, then the ring M_{0}(A) of 0 × 0 matrices over A is the zero ring.
- The direct product of an empty collection of rings is the zero ring.
- The endomorphism ring of the trivial group is the zero ring.
- The ring of continuous real-valued functions on the empty topological space is the zero ring.
