= Ore algebra =

Concept in computer algebra

In computer algebra, an Ore algebra is a special kind of iterated Ore extension that can be used to represent linear functional operators, including linear differential and/or recurrence operators. The concept is named after Øystein Ore.

== Definition ==
Let $K$ be a (commutative) field and $A = K[x_1, \ldots, x_s]$ be a commutative polynomial ring (with $A = K$ when $s = 0$). The iterated skew polynomial ring $A[\partial_1; \sigma_1, \delta_1] \cdots [\partial_r; \sigma_r, \delta_r]$ is called an Ore algebra when the $\sigma_i$ and $\delta_j$ commute for $i \neq j$, and satisfy $\sigma_i(\partial_j) = \partial_j$, $\delta_i(\partial_j) = 0$ for $i > j$.

== Properties ==
Ore algebras satisfy the Ore condition, and thus can be embedded in a (skew) field of fractions.

The constraint of commutation in the definition makes Ore algebras have a non-commutative generalization theory of Gröbner basis for their left ideals.
