= Kasch ring =

In ring theory, a subfield of abstract algebra, a right Kasch ring is a ring R for which every simple right R-module is isomorphic to a right ideal of R. Analogously the notion of a left Kasch ring is defined, and the two properties are independent of each other.

Kasch rings are named in honor of mathematician Friedrich Kasch. Kasch originally called Artinian rings whose proper ideals have nonzero annihilators S-rings. The characterizations below show that Kasch rings generalize S-rings.

== Definition ==
Equivalent definitions will be introduced only for the right-hand version, with the understanding that the left-hand analogues are also true. The Kasch conditions have a few equivalent statements using the concept of annihilators, and this article uses the same notation appearing in the annihilator article.

In addition to the definition given in the introduction, the following properties are equivalent definitions for a ring R to be right Kasch. They appear in Lam (1999, p. 281):

1. For every simple right R-module M, there is a nonzero module homomorphism from M into R.
2. The maximal right ideals of R are right annihilators of ring elements, that is, each one is of the form $\mathrm{r.ann}(x)$ where x is in R.
3. For any maximal right ideal T of R, $\mathrm{\ell.ann}(T) \neq \{0\}$.
4. For any proper right ideal T of R, $\mathrm{\ell.ann}(T) \neq \{0\}$.
5. For any maximal right ideal T of R, $\mathrm{r.ann}(\mathrm{\ell.ann}(T)) = T$.
6. R has no dense right ideals except R itself.

== Examples ==
The content below can be found in references such as Faith (1999, p. 109), Lam (1999, §§8C,19B), Nicholson & Yousif (2003, p.51).

- Let R be a semiprimary ring with Jacobson radical J. If R is commutative, or if R/J is a simple ring, then R is right (and left) Kasch. In particular, commutative Artinian rings are right and left Kasch.
- For a division ring k, consider a certain subring R of the 4-by-4 matrix ring with entries from k. The subring R consists of matrices of the following form:

$$\begin{bmatrix}
a & 0 & b & c \\
0 & a & 0 & d \\
0 & 0 & a & 0 \\
0 & 0 & 0 & e \end{bmatrix}$$

This is a right and left Artinian ring which is right Kasch, but not left Kasch.

- Let S be the ring of power series on two noncommuting variables X and Y with coefficients from a field F. Let the ideal A be the ideal generated by the two elements YX and Y^{2}. The quotient ring S/A is a local ring which is right Kasch but not left Kasch.
- Suppose R is a direct product of infinitely many nonzero rings labeled A_{k}. The direct sum of the A_{k} forms a proper ideal of R. It is easily checked that the left and right annihilators of this ideal are zero, and so R is not right or left Kasch.
- The 2-by-2 upper (or lower) triangular matrix ring is not right or left Kasch.
- A ring with right socle zero (i.e. $\mathrm{soc}(R_R)=\{0\}$) cannot be right Kasch, since the ring contains no minimal right ideals. So, for example, domains which are not division rings are not right or left Kasch.
