= Dual module =

In mathematics, the dual module of a left (respectively right) module M over a ring R is the set of left (respectively right) R-module homomorphisms from M to R with the pointwise right (respectively left) module structure. The dual module is typically denoted M^{∗} or Hom_{R}(M, R).

If the base ring R is a field, then a dual module is a dual vector space.

Every module has a canonical homomorphism to the dual of its dual (called the double dual). A reflexive module is one for which the canonical homomorphism is an isomorphism. A torsionless module is one for which the canonical homomorphism is injective.

Example: If $G = \operatorname{Spec}(A)$ is a finite commutative group scheme represented by a Hopf algebra A over a commutative ring R, then the Cartier dual $G^D$ is the Spec of the dual R-module of A.

== See also ==
- Dual sheaf of a sheaf of modules
