= Multiplicatively closed set =

In abstract algebra, a multiplicatively closed set (or multiplicative set) is a subset S of a ring R such that the following two conditions hold:

- $1 \in S$,
- $xy \in S$ for all $x, y \in S$.

In other words, S is closed under taking finite products, including the empty product 1. Equivalently, a multiplicative set is a submonoid of the multiplicative monoid of a ring.

Multiplicative sets are important especially in commutative algebra, where they are used to build localizations of commutative rings.

A subset S of a ring R is called saturated if it is closed under taking divisors: i.e., whenever a product xy is in S, the elements x and y are in S too.

== Examples ==
Examples of multiplicative sets include:

- the set-theoretic complement of a prime ideal in a commutative ring;
- the set {1, x, x^{2}, x^{3}, ...}, where x is an element of a ring;
- the set of units of a ring;
- the set of non-zero-divisors in a ring;
- 1 + I for an ideal I;
- the Jordan–Pólya numbers, the multiplicative closure of the factorials.

== Properties ==
- An ideal P of a commutative ring R is prime if and only if its complement R \ P is multiplicatively closed.
- An ideal P of a commutative ring R that is maximal with respect to being disjoint from a multiplicative set S is a prime ideal (Krull). In fact, if ideal I is disjoint from S, there exists prime ideal P such that $R\setminus S\supseteq P\supseteq I$.
- A subset S is both saturated and multiplicatively closed if and only if S is the complement of a union of prime ideals. In particular, the complement of a prime ideal is both saturated and multiplicatively closed.
- The intersection of a family of multiplicative sets is a multiplicative set.
- The intersection of a family of saturated sets is saturated.

== See also ==
- Localization of a ring
- Right denominator set
