= Valuative criterion =

In mathematics, specifically algebraic geometry, the valuative criteria are a collection of results that make it possible to decide whether a morphism of algebraic varieties, or more generally schemes, is universally closed, separated, or proper.

== Statement of the valuative criteria ==
Recall that a valuation ring A is a domain, so if K is the field of fractions of A, then Spec K is the generic point of Spec A.

Let X and Y be schemes, and let f : X → Y be a morphism of schemes. Then the following are equivalent:

1. f is separated (resp. universally closed, resp. proper)
2. f is quasi-separated (resp. quasi-compact, resp. of finite type and quasi-separated) and for every valuation ring A, if Y' = Spec A and X' denotes the generic point of Y' , then for every morphism Y' → Y and every morphism X' → X which lifts the generic point, then there exists at most one (resp. at least one, resp. exactly one) lift Y' → X.

The lifting condition is equivalent to specifying that the natural morphism

$$\text{Hom}_Y(Y', X) \to \text{Hom}_Y(\operatorname{Spec} K, X)$$

is injective (resp. surjective, resp. bijective).

Furthermore, in the special case when Y is (locally) Noetherian, it suffices to check the case that A is a discrete valuation ring.
