= Ore extension =

In mathematics, especially in the area of algebra known as ring theory, an Ore extension, named after Øystein Ore, is a special type of a ring extension whose properties are relatively well understood. Elements of a Ore extension are called Ore polynomials.

Ore extensions appear in several natural contexts, including skew and differential polynomial rings, group algebras of polycyclic groups, universal enveloping algebras of solvable Lie algebras, and coordinate rings of quantum groups.

== Definition ==
Suppose that R is a (not necessarily commutative) ring, $\sigma \colon R \to R$ is a ring homomorphism, and $\delta\colon R\to R$ is a σ-derivation of R, which means that $\delta$ is a homomorphism of abelian groups satisfying

$$\delta(r_1 r_2) = \sigma(r_1)\delta(r_2)+\delta(r_1)r_2$$.

Then the Ore extension $R[x;\sigma,\delta]$, also called a skew polynomial ring, is the noncommutative ring obtained by giving the ring of polynomials $R[x]$ a new multiplication, subject to the identity

$$x r = \sigma(r)x + \delta(r)$$.

If δ = 0 (i.e., is the zero map) then the Ore extension is denoted R[x; σ]. If σ = 1 (i.e., the identity map) then the Ore extension is denoted R[x, δ ] and is called a differential polynomial ring.

== Examples ==
The Weyl algebras are Ore extensions, with R any commutative polynomial ring, σ the identity ring endomorphism, and δ the polynomial derivative. Ore algebras are a class of iterated Ore extensions under suitable constraints that permit to develop a noncommutative extension of the theory of Gröbner bases.

== Properties ==
- An Ore extension of a domain is a domain.
- An Ore extension of a skew field is a non-commutative principal ideal domain.
- If σ is an automorphism and R is a left Noetherian ring then the Ore extension R[λ; σ, δ ] is also left Noetherian.

== Elements ==
An element f of an Ore ring R is called

- twosided (or invariant ), if R·f = f·R, and
- central, if g·f = f·g for all g in R.
