= Divisor =

Integer that divides another integer

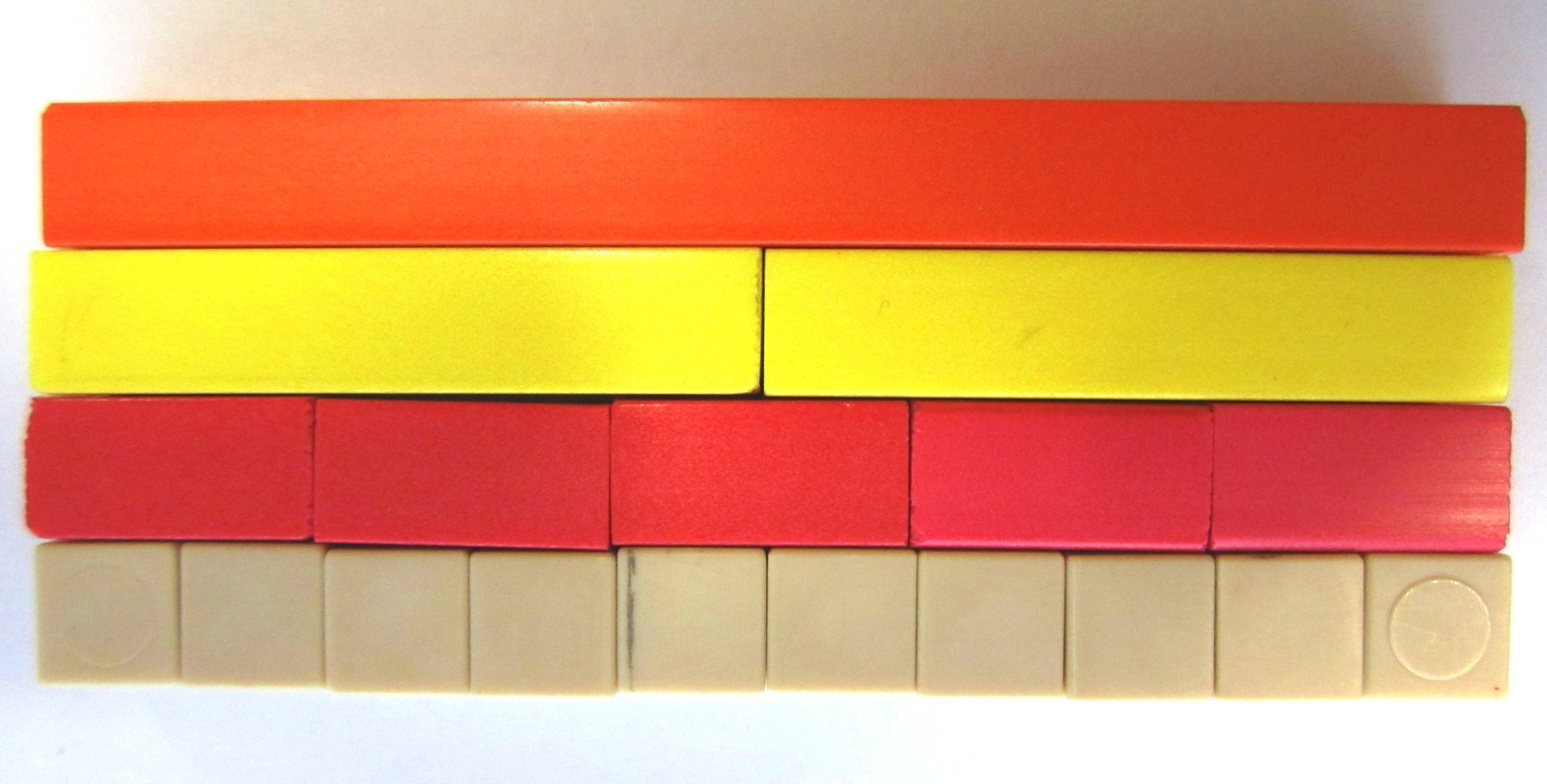
The divisors of 10 illustrated with Cuisenaire rods: 1, 2, 5, and 10

In mathematics, a divisor of an integer $n,$ also called a factor of $n,$ is an integer $m$ that may be multiplied by some integer to produce $n.$ In this case, one also says that $n$ is a multiple of $m.$ An integer $n$ is divisible or evenly divisible by another integer $m$ if $m$ is a divisor of $n$; this implies dividing $n$ by $m$ leaves no remainder.

The concept of a divisor is extended, with the same definition, to elements of any ring; see Divisibility (ring theory).

== Definition ==
An integer $n$ is divisible by a nonzero integer $m$ if there exists an integer $k$ such that $n=km.$ This is written as

$$m\mid n.$$

This may be read as that $m$ divides $n,$ $m$ is a divisor of $n,$ $m$ is a factor of $n,$ or $n$ is a multiple of $m.$ If $m$ does not divide $n,$ then the notation is $m\nmid n.$

There are two conventions, distinguished by whether $m$ is permitted to be zero:

- With the convention without an additional constraint on $m,$ $m \mid 0$ for every integer $m.$
- With the convention that $m$ be nonzero, $m \mid 0$ for every nonzero integer $m.$

== General ==
Divisors can be negative as well as positive, although often the term is restricted to positive divisors. For example, there are six divisors of 4; they are 1, 2, 4, −1, −2, and −4, but only the positive ones (1, 2, and 4) would usually be mentioned.

1 and −1 divide (are divisors of) every integer. Every integer (and its negation) is a divisor of itself. Integers divisible by 2 are called even, and integers not divisible by 2 are called odd.

1, −1, $n$ and $-n$ are known as the trivial divisors of $n.$ A divisor of $n$ that is not a trivial divisor is known as a non-trivial divisor (or strict divisor). A nonzero integer with at least one non-trivial divisor is known as a composite number, while the units −1 and 1 and prime numbers have no non-trivial divisors.

There are divisibility rules that allow one to recognize certain divisors of a number from the number's digits.

== Examples ==
Plot of the number of divisors of integers from 1 to 1000. Prime numbers have exactly 2 divisors, and highly composite numbers are in bold.

- 7 is a divisor of 42 because $7\times 6=42,$ so we can say $7\mid 42.$ It can also be said that 42 is divisible by 7, 42 is a multiple of 7, 7 divides 42, or 7 is a factor of 42.
- The non-trivial divisors of 6 are 2, −2, 3, −3.
- The positive divisors of 42 are 1, 2, 3, 6, 7, 14, 21, 42.
- The set of all positive divisors of 60, $A=\{1,2,3,4,5,6,10,12,15,20,30,60\},$ partially ordered by divisibility, has the Hasse diagram:

== Further notions and facts ==
There are some elementary rules:

- If $a \mid b$ and $b \mid c,$ then $a \mid c;$ that is, divisibility is a transitive relation.
- If $a \mid b$ and $b \mid a,$ then $a = b$ or $a = -b.$ (That is, $a$ and $b$ are associates.)
- If $a \mid b$ and $a \mid c,$ then $a \mid (b + c)$ holds, as does $a \mid (b - c).$ (Note: $a \mid b,\, a \mid c$ $\Rightarrow \exists j\colon ja=b,\, \exists k\colon ka=c$ $\Rightarrow \exists j,k\colon (j+k)a=b+c$ $\Rightarrow a \mid (b+c).$ Similarly, $a \mid b,\, a \mid c$ $\Rightarrow \exists j\colon ja=b,\, \exists k\colon ka=c$ $\Rightarrow \exists j,k\colon (j-k)a=b-c$ $\Rightarrow a \mid (b-c).$) However, if $a \mid b$ and $c \mid b,$ then $(a + c) \mid b$ does not always hold (for example, $2\mid6$ and $3 \mid 6$ but 5 does not divide 6).
- $a \mid b \iff ac \mid bc$ for nonzero $c$. This follows immediately from writing $ka = b \iff kac = bc$.

If $a \mid bc,$ and $\gcd(a, b) = 1,$ then $a \mid c.$ (Note: $\gcd$ refers to the greatest common divisor.) This is called Euclid's lemma.

If $p$ is a prime number and $p \mid ab$ then $p \mid a$ or $p \mid b.$

A positive divisor of $n$ that is different from $n$ is called a proper divisor or an aliquot part of $n$ (for example, the proper divisors of 6 are 1, 2, and 3). A number that does not evenly divide $n$ but leaves a remainder is sometimes called an aliquant part of $n.$

An integer $n > 1$ whose only proper divisor is 1 is called a prime number. Equivalently, a prime number is a positive integer that has exactly two positive factors: 1 and itself.

Any positive divisor of $n$ is a product of prime divisors of $n$, each raised to some power. This is a consequence of the fundamental theorem of arithmetic.

A number $n$ is said to be perfect if it equals the sum of its proper divisors, deficient if the sum of its proper divisors is less than $n,$ and abundant if this sum exceeds $n.$

The total number of positive divisors of $n$ is a multiplicative function $d(n),$ meaning that when two numbers $m$ and $n$ are relatively prime, then $d(mn)=d(m)\times d(n).$ For instance, $d(42) = 8 = 2 \times 2 \times 2 = d(2) \times d(3) \times d(7)$; the eight divisors of 42 are 1, 2, 3, 6, 7, 14, 21 and 42. However, the number of positive divisors is not a totally multiplicative function: if the two numbers $m$ and $n$ share a common divisor, then it might not be true that $d(mn)=d(m)\times d(n).$ The sum of the positive divisors of $n$ is another multiplicative function $\sigma (n)$ (for example, $\sigma (42) = 96 = 3 \times 4 \times 8 = \sigma (2) \times \sigma (3) \times \sigma (7) = 1+2+3+6+7+14+21+42$). Both of these functions are examples of divisor functions.

If the prime factorization of $n$ is given by

$$n = p_1^{\nu_1} \, p_2^{\nu_2} \cdots p_k^{\nu_k}$$

then the number of positive divisors of $n$ is

$$d(n) = (\nu_1 + 1) (\nu_2 + 1) \cdots (\nu_k + 1),$$

and each of the divisors has the form

$$p_1^{\mu_1} \, p_2^{\mu_2} \cdots p_k^{\mu_k}$$

where $0 \le \mu_i \le \nu_i$ for each $1 \le i \le k.$

For every natural $n,$ $d(n) < 2 \sqrt{n}.$

Also,

$$d(1)+d(2)+ \cdots +d(n) = n \ln n + (2 \gamma -1) n + O(\sqrt{n}),$$

where $\gamma$ is Euler–Mascheroni constant. One interpretation of this result is that a randomly chosen positive integer n has an average number of divisors of about $\ln n.$ However, this is a result from the contributions of numbers with "abnormally many" divisors.

== Division lattice ==
In definitions that allow the divisor to be 0, the relation of divisibility turns the set $\mathbb{N}$ of non-negative integers into a partially ordered set that is a complete distributive lattice. The largest element of this lattice is 0 and the smallest is 1. The meet operation ∧ is given by the greatest common divisor and the join operation ∨ by the least common multiple. This lattice is isomorphic to the dual of the lattice of subgroups of the infinite cyclic group Z.

== See also ==
- Arithmetic functions
- Euclidean algorithm
- Fraction (mathematics)
- Integer factorization
- Table of divisors – A table of prime and non-prime divisors for 1–1000
- Table of prime factors – A table of prime factors for 1–1000
- Unitary divisor
