= Divisibility (ring theory) =

Concept in mathematical ring theory

In mathematics, the notion of a divisor originally arose within the context of arithmetic of whole numbers. With the development of abstract rings, of which the integers are the archetype, the original notion of divisor found a natural extension.

Divisibility is a useful concept for the analysis of the structure of commutative rings because of its relationship with the ideal structure of such rings.

== Definition ==
Let R be a ring, (Note: In this article, rings are assumed to have a 1.) and let a and b be elements of R. If there exists an element x in R with ax = b, one says that a is a left divisor of b and that b is a right multiple of a. Similarly, if there exists an element y in R with ya = b, one says that a is a right divisor of b and that b is a left multiple of a. One says that a is a two-sided divisor of b if it is both a left divisor and a right divisor of b; the x and y above are not required to be equal.

When R is commutative, the notions of left divisor, right divisor, and two-sided divisor coincide, so one says simply that a is a divisor of b, or that b is a multiple of a, and one writes $a \mid b$. Elements a and b of an integral domain are associates if both $a \mid b$ and $b \mid a$. The associate relationship is an equivalence relation on R, so it divides R into disjoint equivalence classes.

Note: Although these definitions make sense in any magma, they are used primarily when this magma is the multiplicative monoid of a ring.

== Properties ==
Statements about divisibility in a commutative ring $R$ can be translated into statements about principal ideals. For instance,

- One has $a \mid b$ if and only if $(b) \subseteq (a)$.
- Elements a and b are associates if and only if $(a) = (b)$.
- An element u is a unit if and only if u is a divisor of every element of R.
- An element u is a unit if and only if $(u) = R$.
- If $a = b u$ for some unit u, then a and b are associates. If R is an integral domain, then the converse is true.
- Let R be an integral domain. If the elements in R are totally ordered by divisibility, then R is called a valuation ring.

In the above, $(a)$ denotes the principal ideal of $R$ generated by the element $a$.

== Zero as a divisor, and zero divisors ==
- If one interprets the definition of divisor literally, every a is a divisor of 0, since one can take x = 0. Because of this, it is traditional to abuse terminology by making an exception for zero divisors: one calls an element a in a commutative ring a zero divisor if there exists a nonzero x such that ax = 0.
- Some texts apply the term 'zero divisor' to a nonzero element x where the multiplier a is additionally required to be nonzero where x solves the expression ax = 0, but such a definition is both more complicated and lacks some of the above properties.

== See also ==
- Divisor – divisibility in integers
- Polynomial § Divisibility – divisibility in polynomials
- Quasigroup – an otherwise generic magma with divisibility between every pair of elements
- Zero divisor
- GCD domain
