= Coherent ring =

Algebraic structure

In mathematics, a (left) coherent ring is a ring in which every finitely generated left ideal is finitely presented.

Many theorems about finitely generated modules over Noetherian rings can be extended to finitely presented modules over coherent rings.

Every left Noetherian ring is left coherent. The ring of polynomials in an infinite number of variables over a left Noetherian ring is an example of a left coherent ring that is not left Noetherian.

A ring is left coherent if and only if every direct product of flat right modules is flat (Chase 1960), (Anderson & Fuller 1992, p. 229). Compare this to: A ring is left Noetherian if and only if every direct sum of injective left modules is injective.
