= Zero divisor =

Ring element that can be multiplied by a nonzero element to equal 0

In abstract algebra, an element a of a ring R is called a left zero divisor if there exists a nonzero x in R such that ax = 0, or equivalently if the map from R to R that sends x to ax is not injective. (Note: Since the map is not injective, we have ax = ay, in which x differs from y, and thus a(x − y) = 0.) Similarly, an element a of a ring is called a right zero divisor if there exists a nonzero y in R such that ya = 0. This is a partial case of divisibility in rings. An element that is a left or a right zero divisor is simply called a zero divisor. An element a that is both a left and a right zero divisor is called a two-sided zero divisor (the nonzero x such that ax = 0 may be different from the nonzero y such that ya = 0). If the ring is commutative, then the left and right zero divisors are the same.

An element of a ring that is not a left zero divisor (respectively, not a right zero divisor) is called left regular or left cancellable (respectively, right regular or right cancellable). An element of a ring that is left and right cancellable, and is hence not a zero divisor, is called regular or cancellable, or a non-zero-divisor. (N.B.: In "non-zero-divisor", the prefix "non-" is understood to modify "zero-divisor" as a whole rather than just the word "zero". In some texts, "zero divisor" is written as "zerodivisor" and "non-zero-divisor" as "nonzerodivisor" or "non-zerodivisor" for clarity). A zero divisor that is nonzero is called a nonzero zero divisor or a nontrivial zero divisor. A non-zero ring with no nontrivial zero divisors is called a domain.

== Examples ==
- In the ring $\mathbb{Z}/4\mathbb{Z}$, the residue class $\overline{2}$ is a zero divisor since $\overline{2} \times \overline{2}=\overline{4}=\overline{0}$.
- The only zero divisor of the ring $\mathbb{Z}$ of integers is $0$.
- A nilpotent element of a nonzero ring is always a two-sided zero divisor.
- An idempotent element $e\ne 1$ of a ring is always a two-sided zero divisor, since $e(1-e)=0=(1-e)e$.
- The ring of n × n matrices over a field has nonzero zero divisors if n ≥ 2. Examples of zero divisors in the ring of 2 × 2 matrices (over any nonzero ring) are shown here:

$$\begin{pmatrix}1&1\\2&2\end{pmatrix}\begin{pmatrix}1&1\\-1&-1\end{pmatrix}=\begin{pmatrix}-2&1\\-2&1\end{pmatrix}\begin{pmatrix}1&1\\2&2\end{pmatrix}=\begin{pmatrix}0&0\\0&0\end{pmatrix} ,$$
$$\begin{pmatrix}1&0\\0&0\end{pmatrix}\begin{pmatrix}0&0\\0&1\end{pmatrix}
=\begin{pmatrix}0&0\\0&1\end{pmatrix}\begin{pmatrix}1&0\\0&0\end{pmatrix}
=\begin{pmatrix}0&0\\0&0\end{pmatrix}.$$

- A direct product of two or more nonzero rings always has nonzero zero divisors. For example, in $R_1 \times R_2$ with each $R_i$ nonzero, $(1,0)(0,1) = (0,0)$, so $(1,0)$ is a zero divisor.
- Let $K$ be a field and $G$ be a group. Suppose that $G$ has an element $g$ of finite order $n > 1$. Then in the group ring $K[G]$ one has $(1-g)(1+g+ \cdots +g^{n-1})=1-g^{n}=0$, with neither factor being zero, so $1-g$ is a nonzero zero divisor in $K[G]$.

=== One-sided zero-divisor ===
- Consider the ring of (formal) matrices
  $$\begin{pmatrix}x&y\\0&z\end{pmatrix}$$
  with $x,z\in\mathbb{Z}$ and $y\in\mathbb{Z}/2\mathbb{Z}$. Then
  $$\begin{pmatrix}x&y\\0&z\end{pmatrix}\begin{pmatrix}a&b\\0&c\end{pmatrix}=\begin{pmatrix}xa&xb+yc\\0&zc\end{pmatrix}$$
  and
  $$\begin{pmatrix}a&b\\0&c\end{pmatrix}\begin{pmatrix}x&y\\0&z\end{pmatrix}=\begin{pmatrix}xa&ya+zb\\0&zc\end{pmatrix}$$
  . If $x\ne0\ne z$, then
  $$\begin{pmatrix}x&y\\0&z\end{pmatrix}$$
  is a left zero divisor if and only if $x$ is even, since
  $$\begin{pmatrix}x&y\\0&z\end{pmatrix}\begin{pmatrix}0&1\\0&0\end{pmatrix}=\begin{pmatrix}0&x\\0&0\end{pmatrix}$$
  , and it is a right zero divisor if and only if $z$ is even for similar reasons. If either of $x,z$ is $0$, then it is a two-sided zero-divisor.
- Here is another example of a ring with an element that is a zero divisor on one side only. Let $S$ be the set of all sequences of integers $(a_1,a_2,a_3,...)$. Take for the ring all additive maps from $S$ to $S$, with pointwise addition and composition as the ring operations. (That is, our ring is $\mathrm{End}(S)$, the endomorphism ring of the additive group $S$.) Three examples of elements of this ring are the right shift $R(a_1,a_2,a_3,...)=(0,a_1,a_2,...)$, the left shift $L(a_1,a_2,a_3,...)=(a_2,a_3,a_4,...)$, and the projection map onto the first factor $P(a_1,a_2,a_3,...)=(a_1,0,0,...)$. All three of these additive maps are not zero, and the composites $LP$ and $PR$ are both zero, so $L$ is a left zero divisor and $R$ is a right zero divisor in the ring of additive maps from $S$ to $S$. However, $L$ is not a right zero divisor and $R$ is not a left zero divisor: the composite $LR$ is the identity. $RL$ is a two-sided zero-divisor since $RLP=0=PRL$, while $LR=1$ is not in any direction.

== Non-examples ==
- The ring of integers modulo a prime number has no nonzero zero divisors. Since every nonzero element is a unit, this ring is a finite field.
- More generally, a division ring has no nonzero zero divisors.
- A nonzero commutative ring whose only zero divisor is 0 is called an integral domain.

== Properties ==
- In the ring of n × n matrices over a field, the left and right zero divisors coincide; they are precisely the singular matrices. In the ring of n × n matrices over an integral domain, the zero divisors are precisely the matrices with determinant zero.
- Left or right zero divisors can never be units, because if a is invertible and ax = 0 for some nonzero x, then 0 = a^{−1}0 = a^{−1}ax = x, a contradiction.
- An element is cancellable on the side on which it is regular. That is, if a is a left regular, ax = ay implies that x = y, and similarly for right regular.

== Zero as a zero divisor ==
There is no need for a separate convention for the case a = 0, because the definition applies also in this case:

- If R is a ring other than the zero ring, then 0 is a (two-sided) zero divisor, because any nonzero element x satisfies 0x = 0 = x 0.
- If R is the zero ring, in which 0 = 1, then 0 is not a zero divisor, because there is no nonzero element that when multiplied by 0 yields 0.

Some references include or exclude 0 as a zero divisor in all rings by convention, but they then suffer from having to introduce exceptions in statements such as the following:

- In a commutative ring R, the set of non-zero-divisors is a multiplicative set in R. (This, in turn, is important for the definition of the total quotient ring.) The same is true of the set of non-left-zero-divisors and the set of non-right-zero-divisors in an arbitrary ring, commutative or not.
- In a commutative noetherian ring R, the set of zero divisors is the union of the associated prime ideals of R.

== Zero divisor on a module ==
Let R be a commutative ring, let M be an R-module, and let a be an element of R. One says that a is M-regular if the "multiplication by a" map $M \,\stackrel{a}\to\, M$ is injective, and that a is a zero divisor on M otherwise. The set of M-regular elements is a multiplicative set in R.

Specializing the definitions of "M-regular" and "zero divisor on M" to the case M = R recovers the definitions of "regular" and "zero divisor" given earlier in this article.

== See also ==
- Zero-product property
- Glossary of commutative algebra (Exact zero divisor)
- Zero-divisor graph
- Sedenions, which have zero divisors
