= Prime ideal =

Ideal in a ring which has properties similar to prime elements

A Hasse diagram of a portion of the lattice of ideals of the integers $\Z.$ The purple nodes indicate prime ideals. The purple and green nodes are semiprime ideals, and the purple and blue nodes are primary ideals.

In algebra, a prime ideal is a subset of a ring that shares many important properties of a prime number in the ring of integers. The prime ideals for the integers are the sets that contain all the multiples of a given prime number, together with the zero ideal.

Primitive ideals are prime, and prime ideals are both primary and semiprime.

== Prime ideals for commutative rings ==
=== Definition ===
An ideal P of a commutative ring R is prime if it has the following two properties:

- If a and b are two elements of R such that their product ab is an element of P, then a is in P or b is in P,
- P is not the whole ring R.

This generalizes the following property of prime numbers, known as Euclid's lemma: if p is a prime number and if p divides a product ab of two integers, then p divides a or p divides b. We can therefore say

A positive integer n is a prime number if and only if $n\Z$ is a prime ideal in $\Z.$

The set of prime ideals of a commutative ring R is known as its (prime) spectrum and is denoted $\mathrm{Spec}\ R$. Depending on context, this terminology and notation are also used to refer to the set of prime ideals equipped with additional structures, a topology and a sheaf of rings, that make it a geometric object known as an affine scheme.

=== Alternative definition ===
An equivalent and potentially easier to understand definition is as follows.

Let R be commutative ring. A proper ideal I of R is prime if it has the following property:

- If a $\notin$ I and b $\notin$ I, then ab $\notin$ I.

This property is mathematically equivalent to the standard definition used above as it was derived using the contrapositive.

=== Examples ===
- A simple example: In the ring $R=\Z,$ the subset of even numbers $2\mathbb{Z}$ (also denoted $(2)$, meaning the ideal generated by 2) is a prime ideal.
- Given an integral domain $R$, any prime element $p \in R$ generates a principal prime ideal $(p)$. For example, take an irreducible polynomial $f(x_1, \ldots, x_n)$ in a polynomial ring $\mathbb{F}[x_1,\ldots,x_n]$ over some field $\mathbb{F}$. Eisenstein's criterion for integral domains (hence UFDs) can be effective for determining if an element in a polynomial ring is irreducible.
- If R denotes the ring $\Complex[X,Y]$ of polynomials in two variables with complex coefficients, then the ideal generated by the polynomial Y^{2} − X^{3} − X − 1 is a prime ideal (see elliptic curve).
- In the ring $\Z[X]$ of all polynomials with integer coefficients, the ideal $(2,X)$ generated by 2 and X is a prime ideal. The ideal consists of all polynomials constructed by taking 2 times an element of $\Z[X]$ and adding it to X times another polynomial in $\Z[X]$ (which converts the constant coefficient in the latter polynomial into a linear coefficient). Therefore, the resultant ideal consists of all those polynomials whose constant coefficient is even.
- In any ring R, a maximal ideal is an ideal M that is maximal in the set of all proper ideals of R, i.e. M is contained in exactly two ideals of R, namely M itself and the whole ring R. Every maximal ideal is in fact prime. In a principal ideal domain every nonzero prime ideal is maximal, but this is not true in general. For the UFD $\Complex[x_1,\ldots,x_n]$, Hilbert's Nullstellensatz states that every maximal ideal is of the form $(x_1-\alpha_1, \ldots, x_n-\alpha_n).$
- If M is a smooth manifold, R is the ring of smooth real functions on M, and x is a point in M, then the set of all smooth functions f with f (x) = 0 forms a prime ideal (even a maximal ideal) in R.

=== Non-examples ===
- Consider the composition of the following two quotients

$$\Complex[x,y] \to \frac{\Complex[x,y]}{(x^2 + y^2 - 1)} \to \frac{\Complex[x,y]}{(x^2 + y^2 - 1, x)}$$

Although the first two rings are integral domains (in fact the first is a UFD) the last is not an integral domain since it is isomorphic to

$$\frac{\Complex[x,y]}{(x^2 + y^2 - 1, x)} \cong \frac{\Complex[y]}{(y^2 - 1)} \cong \Complex\times\Complex$$

since $(y^2 - 1)$ factors into $(y - 1)(y + 1)$, which implies the existence of zero divisors in the quotient ring, preventing it from being isomorphic to $\Complex$ and instead to non-integral domain $\Complex\times\Complex$ (by the Chinese remainder theorem).
This shows that the ideal $(x^2 + y^2 - 1, x) \subset \Complex[x,y]$ is not prime. (See the first property listed below.)

- Another non-example is the ideal $(2,x^2 + 5) \subset \Z[x]$ since we have

$$x^2+5 -2\cdot 3=(x-1)(x+1)\in (2,x^2+5)$$

but neither $x-1$ nor $x+1$ is an element of the ideal.

=== Properties ===
- An ideal I in the ring R (with unity) is prime if and only if the factor ring R/I is an integral domain. In particular, a commutative ring (with unity) is an integral domain if and only if (0) is a prime ideal. (The zero ring has no prime ideals, because the ideal (0) is the whole ring.)
- An ideal I is prime if and only if its set-theoretic complement is multiplicatively closed.
- Every nonzero ring contains at least one prime ideal (in fact it contains at least one maximal ideal), which is a direct consequence of Krull's theorem.
- More generally, if S is any multiplicatively closed set in R, then a lemma essentially due to Krull shows that there exists an ideal of R maximal with respect to being disjoint from S, and moreover the ideal must be prime. This can be further generalized to noncommutative rings (see below). In the case S = {1}, we have Krull's theorem, and this recovers the maximal ideals of R. Another prototypical m-system is the set, {x, x^{2}, x^{3}, x^{4}, ...}, of all positive powers of a non-nilpotent element.
- The preimage of a prime ideal under a ring homomorphism is a prime ideal. The analogous fact is not always true for maximal ideals, which is one reason algebraic geometers define the spectrum of a ring to be its set of prime rather than maximal ideals; one wants a homomorphism of rings to give a map between their spectra.
- The set of all prime ideals (called the spectrum of a ring) contains minimal elements (called minimal prime ideals). Geometrically, these correspond to irreducible components of the spectrum.
- The sum of two prime ideals is not necessarily prime. For an example, consider the ring $\Complex[x,y]$ with prime ideals P = (x^{2} + y^{2} − 1) and Q = (x) (the ideals generated by x^{2} + y^{2} − 1 and x respectively). Their sum P + Q = (x^{2} + y^{2} − 1, x) = (y^{2} − 1, x) however is not prime: y^{2} − 1 = (y − 1)(y + 1) ∈ P + Q but its two factors are not. Alternatively, the quotient ring has zero divisors so it is not an integral domain and thus P + Q cannot be prime.
- Not every ideal which cannot be factored into two ideals is a prime ideal; e.g. $(x,y^2)\subset \mathbb{R}[x,y]$ cannot be factored but is not prime.
- In a commutative ring R with at least two elements, if every proper ideal is prime, then the ring is a field. (If the ideal (0) is prime, then the ring R is an integral domain. If q is any non-zero element of R and the ideal (q^{2}) is prime, then it contains q and then q is invertible.)
- A nonzero principal ideal is prime if and only if it is generated by a prime element. In a UFD, every nonzero prime ideal contains a prime element.

=== Uses ===
The introduction of prime ideals in algebraic number theory was a major step forward: it was realized that the important property of unique factorisation expressed in the fundamental theorem of arithmetic does not hold in every ring of algebraic integers, but a substitute was found when Richard Dedekind replaced elements by ideals and prime elements by prime ideals; see Dedekind domain.

Prime ideals play an important role in classical algebraic geometry, where affine algebraic sets are defined as the zero sets of ideals in polynomial rings. If the ideal of polynomials corresponding to an algebraic set is prime, then the algebraic set is an (irreducible) affine variety, meaning that it is not the union of two smaller algebraic sets. In the modern abstract approach to algebraic geometry, prime ideals are particularly important: by starting with an arbitrary commutative ring $A$ and endowing its set of prime ideals (its prime spectrum, $\operatorname{Spec} A$) with additional structures: (1) a topology (the Zariski topology) and (2) a sheaf of rings for each of the open sets under this topology (its structure sheaf), one can construct a (locally) ringed space known as an affine scheme. Patching together compatible affine schemes then gives rise to a generalization of an algebraic variety, known as a scheme. By expanding its scope beyond the traditional setting of polynomial rings over algebraically closed fields, the theory of schemes has vastly extended the reach of algebraic geometry, most notably allowing its tools to be applied to the study of algebraic number theory and Diophantine equations (an area known as arithmetic geometry).

Consider a commutative ring $A$ and its spectrum $X=\operatorname{Spec} A.$ From this modern geometric perspective, a prime ideal $x\equiv\mathfrak{p}_x$ is simultaneously considered to be a point in the spectrum (i.e., $x\in X$) and a subset of the ring (i.e., $\mathfrak{p}_x\subsetneq A$). To avoid confusion (for 'psychological reasons', as one well-known textbook puts it), distinct symbols like $x$ and $\mathfrak{p}_x$ are often used to represent a prime ideal in these dual roles, even though they are, logically speaking, the same entity. In fact, much like a "function" on the space $X,$ a ring element $f\in A$ can be evaluated at a prime ideal $x\in X,$ being assigned the value $f(x):=(f\operatorname{mod} \mathfrak{p}_x)/1$ in the field of fractions of ${A/\mathfrak{p}_x}.$ As a result, $f(x)=0 \iff f\in\mathfrak{p}_x.$

== Prime ideals for noncommutative rings ==
The notion of a prime ideal can be generalized to noncommutative rings by using the commutative definition "ideal-wise". Wolfgang Krull advanced this idea in 1928. The following content can be found in texts such as Goodearl's and Lam's. If R is a (possibly noncommutative) ring and P is a proper ideal of R, we say that P is prime if for any two ideals A and B of R:

- If the product of ideals AB is contained in P, then at least one of A and B is contained in P.

It can be shown that this definition is equivalent to the commutative one in commutative rings. It is readily verified that if an ideal of a noncommutative ring R satisfies the commutative definition of prime, then it also satisfies the noncommutative version. An ideal P satisfying the commutative definition of prime is sometimes called a completely prime ideal to distinguish it from other merely prime ideals in the ring. Completely prime ideals are prime ideals, but the converse is not necessarily true. For example, the zero ideal in the ring of n × n matrices over a field is a prime ideal, but it is not completely prime.

This is close to the historical point of view of ideals as ideal numbers, as for the ring $\Z$ "A is contained in P" is another way of saying "P divides A", and the unit ideal R represents unity.

Equivalent formulations of the ideal P ≠ R being prime include the following properties:

- For all a and b in R, (a)(b) ⊆ P implies a ∈ P or b ∈ P.
- For any two right ideals of R, AB ⊆ P implies A ⊆ P or B ⊆ P.
- For any two left ideals of R, AB ⊆ P implies A ⊆ P or B ⊆ P.
- For any elements a and b of R, if aRb ⊆ P, then a ∈ P or b ∈ P.

Prime ideals in commutative rings are characterized by having multiplicatively closed complements in R, and with slight modification, a similar characterization can be formulated for prime ideals in noncommutative rings. A nonempty subset S ⊆ R is called an m-system if for any a and b in S, there exists r in R such that arb is in S. The following item can then be added to the list of equivalent conditions above:

- The complement R∖P is an m-system.

=== Examples ===
- Any primitive ideal is prime.
- As with commutative rings, maximal ideals are prime, and also prime ideals contain minimal prime ideals.
- A ring is a prime ring if and only if the zero ideal is a prime ideal, and moreover a ring is a domain if and only if the zero ideal is a completely prime ideal.
- Another fact from commutative theory echoed in noncommutative theory is that if A is a nonzero R-module, and P is a maximal element in the poset of annihilator ideals of submodules of A, then P is prime.

== Important facts ==
- Prime avoidance lemma: If R is a commutative ring, I is an ideal of R, and P_{1}, ..., P_{n} is a collection of prime ideals of R, then if I is not contained in any P_{j}, it is also not contained in the union of P_{1}, ..., P_{n}.
- If R is a commutative ring, P is a prime ideal of R, and I_{1}, ..., I_{n} is a collection of ideals of R, then if P does not contain any I_{j}, it also does not contain the intersection of I_{1}, ..., I_{n}.
- If S is any m-system in R, then a lemma essentially due to Krull shows that there exists an ideal I of R maximal with respect to being disjoint from S, and moreover the ideal I must be prime (the primality of I can be proved as follows: if $a, b\not\in I$, then there exist elements $s, t\in S$ such that $s\in I+(a), t\in I+(b)$ by the maximal property of I. Now, if $(a)(b)\subset I$, then $st\in (I+(a))(I+(b))\subset I+(a)(b)\subset I$, which is a contradiction). In the case S = {1}, we have Krull's theorem, and this recovers the maximal ideals of R. Another prototypical m-system is the set, {x, x^{2}, x^{3}, x^{4}, ...}, of all positive powers of a non-nilpotent element.
- For a prime ideal P, the complement R∖P has another property beyond being an m-system. If xy is in R∖P, then both x and y must be in R∖P, since P is an ideal. A set that contains the divisors of its elements is called saturated.
- For a commutative ring R, there is a kind of converse for the previous statement: If S is any nonempty saturated and multiplicatively closed subset of R, the complement R∖S is the union of prime ideals of R.
- The intersection of members of a chain of prime ideals is a prime ideal, and in a commutative ring the union of members of a chain of prime ideals is a prime ideal. With Zorn's Lemma, these observations imply that the poset of prime ideals of a commutative ring (partially ordered by inclusion) has maximal and minimal elements.
- Theorem (I. Cohen): A commutative ring is noetherian if and only if every prime ideal of the ring is finitely generated. There exist non-noetherian commutative rings all of whose maximal ideals are finitely generated.

== Connection to maximality ==
Prime ideals can frequently be produced as maximal elements of certain collections of ideals. For example:

- An ideal maximal with respect to having empty intersection with a fixed m-system is prime.
- An ideal maximal among annihilators of submodules of a fixed R-module M is prime.
- In a commutative ring, an ideal maximal with respect to being non-principal is prime.
- In a commutative ring, an ideal maximal with respect to being not countably generated is prime.

== See also ==
- Radical ideal
- Maximal ideal
- Dedekind–Kummer theorem
- Residue field
