= Domain (ring theory) =

Ring without nonzero zero divisors

In algebra, a domain is a nonzero ring in which ab = 0 implies a = 0 or b = 0. (Sometimes such a ring is said to "have the zero-product property".) Equivalently, a domain is a ring in which 0 is the only left zero divisor (or equivalently, the only right zero divisor). A commutative domain is called an integral domain. Mathematical literature contains multiple variants of the definition of "domain".

== Examples and non-examples ==
- The ring $\mathbb{Z}/6\mathbb{Z}$ is not a domain, because the images of 2 and 3 in this ring are nonzero elements with product 0. More generally, for a positive integer $n$, the ring $\mathbb{Z}/n\mathbb{Z}$ is a domain if and only if $n$ is prime.
- A finite domain is automatically a finite field, by Wedderburn's little theorem.
- The quaternions form a noncommutative domain. More generally, any division ring is a domain, since every nonzero element is invertible.
- The set of all Lipschitz quaternions, that is, quaternions of the form $a+bi+cj+dk$ where a, b, c, d are integers, is a noncommutative subring of the quaternions, hence a noncommutative domain.
- Similarly, the set of all Hurwitz quaternions, that is, quaternions of the form $a+bi+cj+dk$ where a, b, c, d are either all integers or all half-integers, is a noncommutative domain.
- A matrix ring M_{n}(R) for n ≥ 2 is never a domain: if R is nonzero, such a matrix ring has nonzero zero divisors and even nilpotent elements other than 0. For example, the square of the matrix unit E_{12} is 0.
- The tensor algebra of a vector space, or equivalently, the algebra of polynomials in noncommuting variables over a field, $\mathbb{K}\langle x_1,\ldots,x_n\rangle,$ is a domain. This may be proved using an ordering on the noncommutative monomials.
- If R is a domain and S is an Ore extension of R then S is a domain.
- The Weyl algebra is a noncommutative domain.
- The universal enveloping algebra of any Lie algebra over a field is a domain. The proof uses the standard filtration on the universal enveloping algebra and the Poincaré–Birkhoff–Witt theorem.

== Group rings and the zero divisor problem ==
Suppose that G is a group and K is a field. Is the group ring R = K[G] a domain? The identity

$$(1-g)(1+g+\cdots+g^{n-1})=1-g^n,$$

shows that an element g of finite order n > 1 induces a zero divisor 1 − g in R. The zero divisor problem asks whether this is the only obstruction; in other words,

Given a field K and a torsion-free group G, is it true that K[G] contains no zero divisors?

No counterexamples are known, but the problem remains open in general (as of 2017).

For many special classes of groups, the answer is affirmative. Farkas and Snider proved in 1976 that if G is a torsion-free polycyclic-by-finite group and char K = 0 then the group ring K[G] is a domain. Later (1980) Cliff removed the restriction on the characteristic of the field. In 1988, Kropholler, Linnell and Moody generalized these results to the case of torsion-free solvable and solvable-by-finite groups. Earlier (1965) work of Michel Lazard, whose importance was not appreciated by the specialists in the field for about 20 years, had dealt with the case where K is the ring of p-adic integers and G is the pth congruence subgroup of GL(n, Z).

== Spectrum of an integral domain ==
Zero divisors have a topological interpretation, at least in the case of commutative rings: a ring R is an integral domain if and only if it is reduced and its spectrum Spec R is an irreducible topological space. The first property is often considered to encode some infinitesimal information, whereas the second one is more geometric.

An example: the ring k[x, y]/(xy), where k is a field, is not a domain, since the images of x and y in this ring are zero divisors. Geometrically, this corresponds to the fact that the spectrum of this ring, which is the union of the lines x = 0 and y = 0, is not irreducible. Indeed, these two lines are its irreducible components.

== See also ==
- Zero divisor
- Zero-product property
- Divisor (ring theory)
- Integral domain
