= Unit (ring theory) =

In mathematics, element with a multiplicative inverse

In algebra, a unit or invertible element (Note: In the case of rings, the use of "invertible element" is taken as self-evidently referring to multiplication, since all elements of a ring are invertible for addition.) of a ring is an invertible element for the multiplication of the ring. That is, an element u of a ring R is a unit if there exists v in R such that
$$vu = uv = 1,$$
where 1 is the multiplicative identity; the element v is unique for this property and is called the multiplicative inverse of u. The set of units of R forms a group R^{×} under multiplication, called the group of units or unit group of R. (Note: The notation R^{×}, introduced by André Weil, is commonly used in number theory, where unit groups arise frequently. The symbol × is a reminder that the group operation is multiplication. Also, a superscript × is not frequently used in other contexts, whereas a superscript * often denotes dual.) Other notations for the unit group are R^{∗}, U(R), and E(R) (from the German term Einheit).

Less commonly, the term unit is sometimes used to refer to the element 1 of the ring, in expressions like ring with a unit or unit ring, and also unit matrix. Because of this ambiguity, 1 is more commonly called the "unity" or the "identity" of the ring, and the phrases "ring with unity" or a "ring with identity" may be used to emphasize that one is considering a ring instead of a rng.

== Examples ==
The multiplicative identity 1 and its additive inverse −1 are always units. More generally, any root of unity in a ring R is a unit: if r^{n} = 1, then r^{n−1} is a multiplicative inverse of r. In a nonzero ring, the element 0 is not a unit, so R^{×} is not closed under addition. A nonzero ring R in which every nonzero element is a unit (that is, R^{×} = R ∖ {0}) is called a division ring (or a skew-field). A commutative division ring is called a field. For example, the unit group of the field of real numbers R is R ∖ {0}.

=== Integer ring ===
In the ring of integers Z, the only units are 1 and −1.

In the ring Z/nZ of integers modulo n, the units are the congruence classes (mod n) represented by integers coprime to n. They constitute the multiplicative group of integers modulo n.

=== Ring of integers of a number field ===
In the ring Z[√3] obtained by adjoining the quadratic integer √3 to Z, one has (2 + √3)(2 − √3) = 1, so 2 + √3 is a unit, and so are its powers, so Z[√3] has infinitely many units.

More generally, for the ring of integers R in a number field F, Dirichlet's unit theorem states that R^{×} is isomorphic to the group
$$\mathbf Z^n \times \mu_R$$
where $\mu_R$ is the (finite, cyclic) group of roots of unity in R and n, the rank of the unit group, is
$$n = r_1 + r_2 -1,$$
where $r_1, r_2$ are the number of real embeddings and the number of pairs of complex embeddings of F, respectively.

This recovers the Z[√3] example: The unit group of (the ring of integers of) a real quadratic field is infinite of rank 1, since $r_1=2, r_2=0$.

=== Polynomials and power series ===
For a commutative ring R, the units of the polynomial ring R[x] are the polynomials
$$p(x) = a_0 + a_1 x + \dots + a_n x^n$$
such that a_{0} is a unit in R and the remaining coefficients $a_1, \dots, a_n$ are nilpotent, i.e., satisfy $a_i^N = 0$ for some N. In particular, if R is a domain (or more generally reduced), then the units of R[x] are the units of R. The units of the power series ring $R[[x]]$ are the power series
$$p(x)=\sum_{i=0}^\infty a_i x^i$$
such that a_{0} is a unit in R.

=== Matrix rings ===
The unit group of the ring M_{n}(R) of n × n matrices over a ring R is the group GL_{n}(R) of invertible matrices. For a commutative ring R, an element A of M_{n}(R) is invertible if and only if the determinant of A is invertible in R. In that case, A^{−1} can be given explicitly in terms of the adjugate matrix.

=== In general ===
For elements x and y in a ring R, if $1 - xy$ is invertible, then $1 - yx$ is invertible with inverse $1 + y(1-xy)^{-1}x$; this formula can be guessed, but not proved, by the following calculation in a ring of noncommutative power series:
$$(1-yx)^{-1} = \sum_{n \ge 0} (yx)^n = 1 + y \biggl(\sum_{n \ge 0} (xy)^n \biggr)x = 1 + y(1-xy)^{-1}x.$$
See Hua's identity for similar results.

== Group of units ==
A commutative ring is a local ring if R ∖ R^{×} is a maximal ideal.

As it turns out, if R ∖ R^{×} is an ideal, then it is necessarily a maximal ideal and R is local since a maximal ideal is disjoint from R^{×}.

If R is a finite field, then R^{×} is a cyclic group of order |R| − 1.

Every ring homomorphism f : R → S induces a group homomorphism R^{×} → S^{×}, since f maps units to units. In fact, the formation of the unit group defines a functor from the category of rings to the category of groups. This functor has a left adjoint which is the integral group ring construction.

The group scheme $\operatorname{GL}_1$ is isomorphic to the multiplicative group scheme $\mathbb{G}_m$ over any base, so for any commutative ring R, the groups $\operatorname{GL}_1(R)$ and $\mathbb{G}_m(R)$ are canonically isomorphic to U(R). Note that the functor $\mathbb{G}_m$ (that is, R ↦ U(R)) is representable in the sense: $\mathbb{G}_m(R) \simeq \operatorname{Hom}(\mathbb{Z}[t, t^{-1}], R)$ for commutative rings R (this for instance follows from the aforementioned adjoint relation with the group ring construction). Explicitly this means that there is a natural bijection between the set of the ring homomorphisms $\mathbb{Z}[t, t^{-1}] \to R$ and the set of unit elements of R (in contrast, $\mathbb{Z}[t]$ represents the additive group $\mathbb{G}_a$, the forgetful functor from the category of commutative rings to the category of abelian groups).

== Associatedness ==
Suppose that R is commutative. Elements r and s of R are called associate if there exists a unit u in R such that r = us; then write r ~ s. In any ring, pairs of additive inverse elements (Note: x and −x are not necessarily distinct. For example, in the ring of integers modulo 6, one has 3 = −3 even though 1 ≠ −1.) x and −x are associate, since any ring includes the unit −1. For example, 6 and −6 are associate in Z. In general, ~ is an equivalence relation on R.

Associatedness can also be described in terms of the action of R^{×} on R via multiplication: Two elements of R are associate if they are in the same R^{×}-orbit.

In an integral domain, the set of associates of a given nonzero element has the same cardinality as R^{×}.

The equivalence relation ~ can be viewed as any one of Green's semigroup relations specialized to the multiplicative semigroup of a commutative ring R.

== See also ==
- S-units
- Localization of a ring and a module

== Sources ==
- Cohn, Paul M. (2003). Further algebra and applications (Revised ed. of Algebra, 2nd ed.). London: Springer-Verlag. ISBN 1-85233-667-6. Zbl 1006.00001.
- Dummit, David S.; Foote, Richard M. (2004). Abstract Algebra (3rd ed.). John Wiley & Sons. ISBN 0-471-43334-9.
- Jacobson, Nathan (2009). Basic Algebra 1 (2nd ed.). Dover. ISBN 978-0-486-47189-1.
- Lang, Serge (2002). Algebra. Graduate Texts in Mathematics. Springer. ISBN 0-387-95385-X.
- Watkins, John J. (2007), Topics in commutative ring theory, Princeton University Press, ISBN 978-0-691-12748-4, MR 2330411
- Weil, André (1974). Basic number theory. Grundlehren der mathematischen Wissenschaften. Vol. 144 (3rd ed.). Springer-Verlag. ISBN 978-3-540-58655-5.
