= Bézout domain =

Integral domain in which the sum of two principal ideals is again a principal ideal

In mathematics, a Bézout domain is an integral domain in which the sum of two principal ideals is also a principal ideal. This means that Bézout's identity holds for every pair of elements, and that every finitely generated ideal is principal. Bézout domains are a form of Prüfer domain.

Any principal ideal domain (PID) is a Bézout domain, but a Bézout domain need not be a Noetherian ring, so it could have non-finitely generated ideals; if so, it is not a unique factorization domain (UFD), but is still a GCD domain. The theory of Bézout domains retains many of the properties of PIDs, without requiring the Noetherian property.

Bézout domains are named after the French mathematician Étienne Bézout.

== Examples ==
- All PIDs are Bézout domains.
- Examples of Bézout domains that are not PIDs include the ring of entire functions (functions holomorphic on the whole complex plane) and the ring of all algebraic integers. In case of entire functions, the only irreducible elements are functions associated to a polynomial function of degree 1, so an element has a factorization only if it has finitely many zeroes. In the case of the algebraic integers there are no irreducible elements at all, since for any algebraic integer its square root (for instance) is also an algebraic integer. This shows in both cases that the ring is not a UFD, and so certainly not a PID.
- Valuation rings are Bézout domains. Any non-Noetherian valuation ring is an example of a non-noetherian Bézout domain.
- The following general construction produces a Bézout domain S that is not a UFD from any Bézout domain R that is not a field, for instance from a PID; the case R = Z is the basic example to have in mind. Let F be the field of fractions of R, and put S = R + XF[X], the subring of polynomials in F[X] with constant term in R. This ring is not Noetherian, since an element like X with zero constant term can be divided indefinitely by noninvertible elements of R, which are still noninvertible in S, and the ideal generated by all these quotients of is not finitely generated (and so X has no factorization in S). One shows as follows that S is a Bézout domain.

1. It suffices to prove that for every pair a, b in S there exist s, t in S such that as + bt divides both a and b.
2. If a and b have a common divisor d, it suffices to prove this for a/d and b/d, since the same s, t will do.
3. We may assume the polynomials a and b nonzero; if both have a zero constant term, then let n be the minimal exponent such that at least one of them has a nonzero coefficient of X^{n}; one can find f in F such that fX^{n} is a common divisor of a and b and divide by it.
4. We may therefore assume at least one of a, b has a nonzero constant term. If a and b viewed as elements of F[X] are not relatively prime, there is a greatest common divisor of a and b in this UFD that has constant term 1, and therefore lies in S; we can divide by this factor.
5. We may therefore also assume that a and b are relatively prime in F[X], so that 1 lies in aF[X] + bF[X], and some constant polynomial r in R lies in aS + bS. Also, since R is a Bézout domain, the gcd d in R of the constant terms a_{0} and b_{0} lies in a_{0}R + b_{0}R. Since any element without constant term, like a − a_{0} or b − b_{0}, is divisible by any nonzero constant, the constant d is a common divisor in S of a and b; we shall show it is in fact a greatest common divisor by showing that it lies in aS + bS. Multiplying a and b respectively by the Bézout coefficients for d with respect to a_{0} and b_{0} gives a polynomial p in aS + bS with constant term d. Then p − d has a zero constant term, and so is a multiple in S of the constant polynomial r, and therefore lies in aS + bS. But then d does as well, which completes the proof.

== Properties ==
A ring is a Bézout domain if and only if it is an integral domain in which any two elements have a greatest common divisor that is a linear combination of them: this is equivalent to the statement that an ideal which is generated by two elements is also generated by a single element, and induction demonstrates that all finitely generated ideals are principal. The expression of the greatest common divisor of two elements of a PID as a linear combination is often called Bézout's identity, whence the terminology.

Note that the above gcd condition is stronger than the mere existence of a gcd. An integral domain where a gcd exists for any two elements is called a GCD domain and thus Bézout domains are GCD domains. In particular, in a Bézout domain, irreducibles are prime (but as the algebraic integer example shows, they need not exist).

For a Bézout domain R, the following conditions are all equivalent:

1. R is a principal ideal domain.
2. R is Noetherian.
3. R is a unique factorization domain (UFD).
4. R satisfies the ascending chain condition on principal ideals (ACCP).
5. Every nonzero nonunit in R factors into a product of irreducibles (R is an atomic domain).

The equivalence of (1) and (2) was noted above. Since a Bézout domain is a GCD domain, it follows immediately that (3), (4) and (5) are equivalent. Finally, if R is not Noetherian, then there exists an infinite ascending chain of finitely generated ideals, so in a Bézout domain an infinite ascending chain of principal ideals. (4) and (2) are thus equivalent.

A Bézout domain is a Prüfer domain, i.e., a domain in which each finitely generated ideal is invertible, or said another way, a commutative semihereditary domain.)

Consequently, one may view the equivalence "Bézout domain iff Prüfer domain and GCD-domain" as analogous to the more familiar "PID iff Dedekind domain and UFD".

Prüfer domains can be characterized as integral domains whose localizations at all prime (equivalently, at all maximal) ideals are valuation domains. So the localization of a Bézout domain at a prime ideal is a valuation domain. Since an invertible ideal in a local ring is principal, a local ring is a Bézout domain iff it is a valuation domain. Moreover, a valuation domain with noncyclic (equivalently non-discrete) value group is not Noetherian, and every totally ordered abelian group is the value group of some valuation domain. This gives many examples of non-Noetherian Bézout domains.

In noncommutative algebra, right Bézout domains are domains whose finitely generated right ideals are principal right ideals, that is, of the form xR for some x in R. One notable result is that a right Bézout domain is a right Ore domain. This fact is not interesting in the commutative case, since every commutative domain is an Ore domain. Right Bézout domains are also right semihereditary rings.

== Modules over a Bézout domain ==
Some facts about modules over a PID extend to modules over a Bézout domain. Let R be a Bézout domain and M finitely generated module over R. Then M is flat if and only if it is torsion-free.

== See also ==
- Semifir (a commutative semifir is precisely a Bézout domain.)
- Bézout ring

== Bibliography ==
- Cohn, P. M. (1968), "Bezout rings and their subrings" (PDF), Mathematical Proceedings of the Cambridge Philosophical Society, 64 (2): 251–264, doi:10.1017/s0305004100042791, MR 0222065
- Helmer, Olaf (1940), "Divisibility properties of integral functions", Duke Math. J., 6 (2): 345–356, doi:10.1215/s0012-7094-40-00626-3, ISSN 0012-7094, MR 0001851
- Kaplansky, Irving (1970), Commutative rings, Boston, Mass.: Allyn and Bacon Inc., pp. x+180, MR 0254021
- Bourbaki, Nicolas (1989), Commutative algebra
- "Bezout ring", Encyclopedia of Mathematics, EMS Press, 2001 [1994]
