= Schreier domain =

Mathematical structure where elements are primal

In abstract algebra, a Schreier domain, named after Otto Schreier, is an integrally closed domain where every nonzero element is primal; i.e., whenever x divides yz, x can be written as x = x_{1} x_{2} so that x_{1} divides y and x_{2} divides z. An integral domain is said to be pre-Schreier if every nonzero element is primal. A GCD domain is an example of a Schreier domain. The term "Schreier domain" was introduced by P. M. Cohn in 1960s. The term "pre-Schreier domain" is due to Muhammad Zafrullah.

In general, an irreducible element is primal if and only if it is a prime element. Consequently, in a pre-Schreier domain, every irreducible is prime. In particular, an atomic pre-Schreier domain is a unique factorization domain; this generalizes the fact that an atomic GCD domain is a UFD.
