= Ascending chain condition on principal ideals =

In abstract algebra, the ascending chain condition can be applied to the posets of principal left, principal right, or principal two-sided ideals of a ring, partially ordered by inclusion. The ascending chain condition on principal ideals (abbreviated to ACCP) is satisfied if there is no infinite strictly ascending chain of principal ideals of the given type (left/right/two-sided) in the ring, or said another way, every ascending chain is eventually constant.

The counterpart descending chain condition may also be applied to these posets, however there is currently no need for the terminology "DCCP" since such rings are already called left or right perfect rings. (See § Noncommutative rings below.)

Noetherian rings (e.g. principal ideal domains) are typical examples, but some important non-Noetherian rings also satisfy (ACCP), notably unique factorization domains and left or right perfect rings.

== Commutative rings ==
It is well known that a nonzero nonunit in a Noetherian integral domain factors into irreducibles. The proof of this relies on only (ACCP) not (ACC), so in any integral domain with (ACCP), an irreducible factorization exists. (In other words, any integral domains with (ACCP) are atomic. But the converse is false, as shown in (Grams 1974).) Such a factorization may not be unique; the usual way to establish uniqueness of factorizations uses Euclid's lemma, which requires factors to be prime rather than just irreducible. Indeed, one has the following characterization: let A be an integral domain. Then the following are equivalent.

1. A is a UFD.
2. A satisfies (ACCP) and every irreducible of A is prime.
3. A is a GCD domain satisfying (ACCP).

The so-called Nagata criterion holds for an integral domain A satisfying (ACCP): Let S be a multiplicatively closed subset of A generated by prime elements. If the localization S^{−1}A is a UFD, so is A. (Note that the converse of this is trivial.)

An integral domain A satisfies (ACCP) if and only if the polynomial ring A[t] does. The analogous fact is false if A is not an integral domain.

An integral domain where every finitely generated ideal is principal (that is, a Bézout domain) satisfies (ACCP) if and only if it is a principal ideal domain.

The ring Z+XQ[X] of all rational polynomials with integral constant term is an example of an integral domain (actually a GCD domain) that does not satisfy (ACCP), for the chain of principal ideals

$$(X) \subset (X/2) \subset (X/4) \subset (X/8), ...$$

is non-terminating.

== Noncommutative rings ==
In the noncommutative case, it becomes necessary to distinguish the right ACCP from left ACCP. The former only requires the poset of ideals of the form xR to satisfy the ascending chain condition, and the latter only examines the poset of ideals of the form Rx.

A theorem of Hyman Bass in (Bass 1960) now known as "Bass' Theorem P" showed that the descending chain condition on principal left ideals of a ring R is equivalent to R being a right perfect ring. D. Jonah showed in (Jonah 1970) that there is a side-switching connection between the ACCP and perfect rings. It was shown that if R is right perfect (satisfies right DCCP), then R satisfies the left ACCP, and symmetrically, if R is left perfect (satisfies left DCCP), then it satisfies the right ACCP. The converses are not true, and the above switches between "left" and "right" are not typos.

Whether the ACCP holds on the right or left side of R, it implies that R has no infinite set of nonzero orthogonal idempotents, and that R is a Dedekind finite ring.
