= GCD domain =

Mathematical structure with greatest common divisors

In mathematics, a GCD domain is an integral domain R with the property that any two elements have a greatest common divisor (GCD); i.e., there is a minimum principal ideal containing the ideal generated by two given elements. Equivalently, any two elements of R have a least common multiple (LCM).

A GCD domain generalizes a unique factorization domain (UFD) to a non-Noetherian setting in the following sense: an integral domain is a UFD if and only if it is a GCD domain satisfying the ascending chain condition on principal ideals (and in particular if it is Noetherian).

GCD domains appear in the following chain of class inclusions:

rngs ⊃ rings ⊃ commutative rings ⊃ integral domains ⊃ integrally closed domains ⊃ GCD domains ⊃ unique factorization domains ⊃ principal ideal domains ⊃ Euclidean domains ⊃ fields ⊃ algebraically closed fields

== Properties ==
Every irreducible element of a GCD domain is prime. A GCD domain is integrally closed, and every nonzero element is primal. In other words, every GCD domain is a Schreier domain.

For every pair of elements x, y of a GCD domain R, a GCD d of x and y and an LCM m of x and y can be chosen such that dm = xy, or stated differently, if x and y are nonzero elements and d is any GCD d of x and y, then xy/d is an LCM of x and y, and vice versa. It follows that the operations of GCD and LCM make the quotient R/~ into a distributive lattice, where "~" denotes the equivalence relation of being associate elements. The equivalence between the existence of GCDs and the existence of LCMs is not a corollary of the similar result on complete lattices, as the quotient R/~ need not be a complete lattice for a GCD domain R.

If R is a GCD domain, then the polynomial ring R[X_{1},...,X_{n}] is also a GCD domain.

R is a GCD domain if and only if finite intersections of its principal ideals are principal. In particular, $(a) \cap (b) = (c)$, where $c$ is the LCM of $a$ and $b$.

For a polynomial in X over a GCD domain, one can define its content as the GCD of all its coefficients. Then the content of a product of polynomials is the product of their contents, as expressed by Gauss's lemma, which is valid over GCD domains.

== Examples ==
- A unique factorization domain is a GCD domain. Among the GCD domains, the unique factorization domains are precisely those that are also atomic domains (which means that at least one factorization into irreducible elements exists for any nonzero nonunit).
- A Bézout domain (i.e., an integral domain where every finitely generated ideal is principal) is a GCD domain. Unlike principal ideal domains (where every ideal is principal), a Bézout domain need not be a unique factorization domain; for instance the ring of entire functions is a non-atomic Bézout domain, and there are many other examples. An integral domain is a Prüfer GCD domain if and only if it is a Bézout domain.
- If R is a non-atomic GCD domain, then R[X] is an example of a GCD domain that is neither a unique factorization domain (since it is non-atomic) nor a Bézout domain (since X and a non-invertible and non-zero element a of R generate an ideal not containing 1, but 1 is nevertheless a GCD of X and a); more generally any ring R[X_{1},...,X_{n}] has these properties.
- A commutative monoid ring $R[X; S]$ is a GCD domain iff $R$ is a GCD domain and $S$ is a torsion-free cancellative GCD-semigroup. A GCD-semigroup is a semigroup with the additional property that for any $a$ and $b$ in the semigroup $S$, there exists a $c$ such that $(a + S) \cap (b + S) = c + S$. In particular, if $G$ is an abelian group, then $R[X;G]$ is a GCD domain iff $R$ is a GCD domain and $G$ is torsion-free.
- The ring $\mathbb Z[\sqrt{-d}]$ is not a GCD domain for all square-free integers $d\ge 3$.

== G-GCD domains ==
Many of the properties of GCD domain carry over to Generalized GCD domains, where principal ideals are generalized to invertible ideals and where the intersection of two invertible ideals is invertible, so that the group of invertible ideals forms a lattice. In GCD rings, ideals are invertible if and only if they are principal, meaning the GCD and LCM operations can also be treated as operations on invertible ideals.

Examples of G-GCD domains include GCD domains, polynomial rings over GCD domains, Prüfer domains, and π-domains (domains where every principal ideal is the product of prime ideals), which generalizes the GCD property of Bézout domains and unique factorization domains.
