= Prime number theory =

Prime number theory may refer to:

- Prime number
- Prime number theorem
- Number theory

== See also ==
Fundamental theorem of arithmetic, which explains prime factorization.
