= Atomic domain =

In mathematics, more specifically ring theory, an atomic domain or factorization domain is an integral domain in which every non-zero non-unit can be written in at least one way as a finite product of irreducible elements. Atomic domains are different from unique factorization domains in that this decomposition of an element into irreducibles need not be unique; stated differently, an irreducible element is not necessarily a prime element.

Important examples of atomic domains include the class of all unique factorization domains and all Noetherian domains. More generally, any integral domain satisfying the ascending chain condition on principal ideals (ACCP) is an atomic domain. Although the converse is claimed to hold in Cohn's paper, this is known to be false.

The term "atomic" is due to P. M. Cohn, who called an irreducible element of an integral domain an "atom".

== Motivation ==
In this section, a ring can be viewed as merely an abstract set in which one can perform the operations of addition and multiplication; analogous to the integers.

The ring of integers (that is, the set of integers with the natural operations of addition and multiplication) satisfy many important properties. One such property is the fundamental theorem of arithmetic. Thus, when considering abstract rings, a natural question to ask is under what conditions such a theorem holds. Since a unique factorization domain is precisely a ring in which an analogue of the fundamental theorem of arithmetic holds, this question is readily answered. However, one notices that there are two aspects of the fundamental theorem of the arithmetic: first, that any integer is the finite product of prime numbers, and second, that this product is unique up to rearrangement (and multiplication by units). Therefore, it is also natural to ask under what conditions particular elements of a ring can be "decomposed" without requiring uniqueness. The concept of an atomic domain addresses this.

== Definition ==
Let R be an integral domain. If every non-zero non-unit x of R can be written as a product of irreducible elements, R is referred to as an atomic domain. (The product is necessarily finite, since infinite products are not defined in ring theory. Such a product is allowed to involve the same irreducible element more than once as a factor.) Any such expression is called a factorization of x.

== Special cases ==
In an atomic domain, it is possible that different factorizations of the same element x have different lengths. It is even possible that among the factorizations of x there is no bound on the number of irreducible factors. If on the contrary the number of factors is bounded for every non-zero non-unit x, then R is a bounded factorization domain (BFD); formally this means that for each such x there exists an integer N such that if x = x_{1}x_{2}...x_{n} with none of the x_{i} invertible then n < N.

If such a bound exists, no chain of proper divisors from x to 1 can exceed this bound in length (since the quotient at every step can be factored, producing a factorization of x with at least one irreducible factor for each step of the chain), so there cannot be any infinite strictly ascending chain of principal ideals of R. That condition, called the ascending chain condition on principal ideals or ACCP, is strictly weaker than the BFD condition, and strictly stronger than the atomic condition (in other words, even if there exist infinite chains of proper divisors, it can still be that every x possesses a finite factorization).

Two independent conditions that are both strictly stronger than the BFD condition are the half-factorial domain condition (HFD: any two factorizations of any given x have the same length) and the finite factorization domain condition (FFD: any x has but a finite number of non-associate divisors). Every unique factorization domain obviously satisfies these two conditions, but neither implies unique factorization.
