= Dedekind–Hasse norm =

In mathematics, in particular the study of abstract algebra, a Dedekind–Hasse norm is a function on an integral domain that generalises the notion of a Euclidean function on Euclidean domains.

== Definition ==
Let R be an integral domain and g : R → Z_{≥0} be a function from R to the non-negative integers. Denote by 0_{R} the additive identity of R. The function g is called a Dedekind–Hasse norm on R if the following three conditions are satisfied:

- g(a) = 0 if and only if a = 0_{R},
- for any nonzero elements a and b in R either:
  - b divides a in R, or
  - there exist elements x and y in R such that 0 < g(xa − yb) < g(b).

The third condition is a slight generalisation of condition (EF1) of Euclidean functions, as defined in the Euclidean domain article. If the value of x can always be taken as 1 then g will in fact be a Euclidean function and R will therefore be a Euclidean domain.

== Integral and principal ideal domains ==
The notion of a Dedekind–Hasse norm was developed independently by Richard Dedekind and, later, by Helmut Hasse. They both noticed it was precisely the extra piece of structure needed to turn an integral domain into a principal ideal domain. To wit, they proved that if an integral domain R has a Dedekind–Hasse norm, then R is a principal ideal domain.

== Example ==
Let K be a field and consider the polynomial ring K[X]. The function g on this domain that maps a nonzero polynomial p to 2^{deg(p)}, where deg(p) is the degree of p, and maps the zero polynomial to zero, is a Dedekind–Hasse norm on K[X]. The first two conditions are satisfied simply by the definition of g, while the third condition can be proved using polynomial long division.
