= Principal ideal domain =

Algebraic structure

In mathematics, a principal ideal domain, or PID, is an integral domain (that is, a non-zero commutative ring without nonzero zero divisors) in which every ideal is principal (that is, is formed by the multiples of a single element). Some authors such as Bourbaki refer to PIDs as principal rings.

Principal ideal domains are mathematical objects that behave like the integers, with respect to divisibility: any element of a PID has a unique factorization into prime elements (so an analogue of the fundamental theorem of arithmetic holds); any two elements of a PID have a greatest common divisor (although it may not be possible to find it using the Euclidean algorithm). If x and y are elements of a PID without common divisors, then every element of the PID can be written in the form ax + by, etc.

Principal ideal domains are Noetherian, they are integrally closed, they are unique factorization domains and Dedekind domains. All Euclidean domains and all fields are principal ideal domains.

Some authors additionally require principal ideal domains to have Krull dimension one, or equivalently, to possess ideals that are nonzero and proper, in order to specifically exclude fields, while most other sources regard fields as trivial special cases of principal ideal domains.

Principal ideal domains appear in the following chain of class inclusions:

rngs ⊃ rings ⊃ commutative rings ⊃ integral domains ⊃ integrally closed domains ⊃ GCD domains ⊃ unique factorization domains ⊃ principal ideal domains ⊃ Euclidean domains ⊃ fields ⊃ algebraically closed fields

== Examples ==
Examples include:

- $K$: any field, whose only ideals are $(0)$ and $K$,
- $\mathbb{Z}$: the ring of integers,
- $K[x]$: rings of polynomials in one variable with coefficients in a field. (The converse is also true, i.e. if $A[x]$ is a PID then $A$ is a field.) Furthermore, a ring of formal power series in one variable over a field is a PID since every ideal is of the form $(x^k)$,
- $\mathbb{Z}[i]$: the ring of Gaussian integers,
- $\mathbb{Z}[\omega]$ (where $\omega$ is a primitive cube root of 1): the Eisenstein integers,
- Any discrete valuation ring, for instance the ring of p-adic integers $\mathbb{Z}_p$.

=== Non-examples ===
Examples of integral domains that are not PIDs:

- $\mathbb{Z}[\sqrt{-3}]$ is an example of a ring that is not a unique factorization domain, since $4 = 2\cdot 2 = (1+\sqrt{-3})(1-\sqrt{-3}).$ Hence it is not a principal ideal domain because principal ideal domains are unique factorization domains. Also, $\langle 2, 1+\sqrt{-3} \rangle$ is an ideal that cannot be generated by a single element.
- $\mathbb{Z}[x]$: the ring of all polynomials with integer coefficients. It is not principal because $\langle 2, x \rangle$ is an ideal that cannot be generated by a single polynomial.
- $K[x_1, x_2, \ldots, x_n],$ the ring of polynomials in at least two variables over a ring K is not principal, since the ideal $\langle x_1, x_2 \rangle$ is not principal.
- Most rings of algebraic integers are not principal ideal domains. This is one of the main motivations behind Dedekind's definition of Dedekind domains, which allows replacing unique factorization of elements with unique factorization of ideals. In particular, many $\mathbb{Z}[\zeta_p],$ for the primitive p-th root of unity $\zeta_p,$ are not principal ideal domains. The class number of a ring of algebraic integers gives a measure of "how far away" the ring is from being a principal ideal domain.

== Modules ==
The key result is the structure theorem: If R is a principal ideal domain, and M is a finitely generated R-module, then $M$ is a direct sum of cyclic modules, i.e., modules with one generator. The cyclic modules are isomorphic to $R/xR$ for some $x\in R$ (notice that $x$ may be equal to $0$, in which case $R/xR$ is $R$).

If M is a free module over a principal ideal domain R, then every submodule of M is again free. This does not hold for modules over arbitrary rings, as the example $(2,X) \subseteq \mathbb{Z}[X]$ of modules over $\mathbb{Z}[X]$ shows.

== Properties ==
In a principal ideal domain, any two elements a,b have a greatest common divisor, which may be obtained as a generator of the ideal (a, b).

All Euclidean domains are principal ideal domains, but the converse is not true. An example of a principal ideal domain that is not a Euclidean domain is the ring $\mathbb{Z}\bigl[\tfrac12\bigl(1+\sqrt{-19}~\!\bigr)\bigr]$, this was proved by Theodore Motzkin and was the first case known. In this domain no q and r exist, with 0 ≤ |r| < 4, so that $\bigl(1+\sqrt{-19~\!}\bigr)=(4)q+r$, despite $1+\sqrt{-19}$ and $4$ having a greatest common divisor of 2.

Every principal ideal domain is a unique factorization domain (UFD). The converse does not hold since for any UFD K, the ring K[X, Y] of polynomials in 2 variables is a UFD but is not a PID. (To prove this look at the ideal generated by $\left\langle X,Y \right\rangle.$ It is not the whole ring since it contains no polynomials of degree 0, but it cannot be generated by any one single element.)

1. Every principal ideal domain is Noetherian.
2. In all unital rings, maximal ideals are prime. In principal ideal domains a near converse holds: every nonzero prime ideal is maximal.
3. All principal ideal domains are integrally closed.

The previous three statements give the definition of a Dedekind domain, and hence every principal ideal domain is a Dedekind domain.

Let A be an integral domain, the following are equivalent.

1. A is a PID.
2. Every prime ideal of A is principal.
3. A is a Dedekind domain that is a UFD.
4. Every finitely generated ideal of A is principal (i.e., A is a Bézout domain) and A satisfies the ascending chain condition on principal ideals.
5. A admits a Dedekind–Hasse norm.

Any Euclidean norm is a Dedekind-Hasse norm; thus, (5) shows that a Euclidean domain is a PID. (4) compares to:

- An integral domain is a UFD if and only if it is a GCD domain (i.e., a domain where every two elements have a greatest common divisor) satisfying the ascending chain condition on principal ideals.

An integral domain is a Bézout domain if and only if any two elements in it have a gcd that is a linear combination of the two. A Bézout domain is thus a GCD domain, and (4) gives yet another proof that a PID is a UFD.

== See also ==
- Bézout's identity
