= Noncommutative unique factorization domain =

In mathematics, a noncommutative unique factorization domain is a noncommutative ring with the unique factorization property.

== Examples ==
- The ring of Hurwitz quaternions, also known as integral quaternions. A quaternion a = a_{0} + a_{1}i + a_{2}j + a_{3}k is integral if either all the coefficients a_{i} are integers or all of them are half-integers.
- All free associative algebras.
