= Principal ideal =

Ring ideal generated by a single element of the ring

In mathematics, specifically ring theory, a principal ideal is an ideal $I$ in a ring $R$ that is generated by a single element $a$ of $R$ through multiplication by every element of $R.$ The term also has another, similar meaning in order theory, where it refers to an (order) ideal in a poset $P$ generated by a single element $x \in P,$ which is to say the set of all elements less than or equal to $x$ in $P.$

The remainder of this article addresses the ring-theoretic concept.

== Definitions ==
- A left principal ideal of $R$ is a subset of $R$ given by $Ra = \{ra : r \in R\}$ for some element $a.$
- A right principal ideal of $R$ is a subset of $R$ given by $aR = \{ar : r \in R\}$ for some element $a.$
- A two-sided principal ideal of $R$ is a subset of $R$ given by $RaR = \{r_1 a s_1 + \ldots + r_n a s_n: r_1,s_1, \ldots, r_n, s_n \in R\}$ for some element $a,$ namely, the set of all finite sums of elements of the form $ras.$

While the definition for two-sided principal ideal may seem more complicated than for the one-sided principal ideals, it is necessary to ensure that the ideal remains closed under addition.

If $R$ is a commutative ring, then the above three notions are all the same. In that case, it is common to write the ideal generated by $a$ as $\langle a \rangle$ or $(a).$

== Examples and non-examples ==
- The principal ideals in the (commutative) ring $\mathbb{Z}$ are $\langle n \rangle = n\mathbb{Z}=\{\ldots,-2n,-n,0,n,2n,\ldots\}.$ In fact, every ideal of $\mathbb{Z}$ is principal (see § Related definitions).
- In any ring $R$, the sets $\{0\}= \langle 0\rangle$ and $R=\langle 1\rangle$ are principal ideals.
- For any ring $R$ and element $a,$ the ideals $Ra,aR,$ and $RaR$ are respectively left, right, and two-sided principal ideals, by definition. For example, $\langle \sqrt{-3} \rangle$ is a principal ideal of $\mathbb{Z}[\sqrt{-3}].$
- In the commutative ring $\mathbb{C}[x,y]$ of complex polynomials in two variables, the set of polynomials that vanish everywhere on the set of points $\{(x,y)\in\mathbb{C}^2\mid x=0\}$ is a principal ideal because it can be written as $\langle x\rangle$ (the set of polynomials divisible by $x$).
- In the same ring $\mathbb{C}[x,y]$, the ideal $\langle x, y\rangle$ generated by both $x$ and $y$ is not principal. (The ideal $\langle x, y\rangle$ is the set of all polynomials with zero for the constant term.) To see this, suppose there existed a generator $p$ for $\langle x,y\rangle,$ so $\langle x, y\rangle=\langle p\rangle.$ Then $\langle p\rangle$ contains both $x$ and $y,$ so $p$ must divide both $x$ and $y.$ Then $p$ must be a nonzero constant polynomial. This is a contradiction since $p\in\langle p\rangle$, but the only constant polynomial in $\langle x, y\rangle$ is the zero polynomial.
- In the ring $\mathbb{Z}[\sqrt{-3}] = \{a + b\sqrt{-3}: a, b\in \mathbb{Z} \},$ the numbers where $a + b$ is even form a non-principal ideal. This ideal forms a regular hexagonal lattice in the complex plane. Consider $(a,b) = (2,0)$ and $(1,1).$ These numbers are elements of this ideal with the same norm (two), but because the only units in the ring are $1$ and $-1,$ they are not associates.

== Related definitions ==
A ring in which every ideal is principal is called principal, or a principal ideal ring. A principal ideal domain (PID) is an integral domain in which every ideal is principal. Any PID is a unique factorization domain; the normal proof of unique factorization in the integers (the so-called fundamental theorem of arithmetic) holds in any PID.

As an example, $\mathbb{Z}$ is a principal ideal domain, which can be shown as follows. Suppose $I=\langle n_1, n_2, \ldots\rangle$ where $n_1\neq 0,$ and consider the surjective homomorphisms $\mathbb{Z}/\langle n_1\rangle \rightarrow \mathbb{Z}/\langle n_1, n_2\rangle \rightarrow \mathbb{Z}/\langle n_1, n_2, n_3\rangle\rightarrow \cdots.$ Since $\mathbb{Z}/\langle n_1\rangle$ is finite, for sufficiently large $k$ we have $\mathbb{Z}/\langle n_1, n_2, \ldots, n_k\rangle = \mathbb{Z}/\langle n_1, n_2, \ldots, n_{k+1}\rangle = \cdots.$ Thus $I=\langle n_1, n_2, \ldots, n_k\rangle,$ which implies $I$ is always finitely generated. Since the ideal $\langle a,b\rangle$ generated by any integers $a$ and $b$ is exactly $\langle \mathop{\mathrm{gcd}}(a,b)\rangle,$ by induction on the number of generators it follows that $I$ is principal.

== Properties ==
Any Euclidean domain is a PID; the algorithm used to calculate greatest common divisors may be used to find a generator of any ideal. More generally, any two principal ideals in a commutative ring have a greatest common divisor in the sense of ideal multiplication. In principal ideal domains, this allows us to calculate greatest common divisors of elements of the ring, up to multiplication by a unit; we define $\gcd(a, b)$ to be any generator of the ideal $\langle a, b \rangle.$

For a Dedekind domain $R,$ we may also ask, given a non-principal ideal $I$ of $R,$ whether there is some extension $S$ of $R$ such that the ideal of $S$ generated by $I$ is principal (said more loosely, $I$ becomes principal in $S$). This question arose in connection with the study of rings of algebraic integers (which are examples of Dedekind domains) in number theory, and led to the development of class field theory by Teiji Takagi, Emil Artin, David Hilbert, and many others.

The principal ideal theorem of class field theory states that every integer ring $R$ (i.e. the ring of integers of some number field) is contained in a larger integer ring $S$ which has the property that every ideal of $R$ becomes a principal ideal of $S.$ In this theorem we may take $S$ to be the ring of integers of the Hilbert class field of $R$; that is, the maximal unramified abelian extension (that is, Galois extension whose Galois group is abelian) of the fraction field of $R,$ and this is uniquely determined by $R.$

Krull's principal ideal theorem states that if $R$ is a Noetherian ring and $I$ is a principal, proper ideal of $R,$ then $I$ has height at most one.

== See also ==
- Ascending chain condition for principal ideals
