= Prime element =

Analogue of a prime number in a commutative ring

In mathematics, specifically in abstract algebra, a prime element of a commutative ring is an object satisfying certain properties similar to the prime numbers in the integers and to irreducible polynomials. Care should be taken to distinguish prime elements from irreducible elements, a concept that is the same in unique factorization domains but not the same in general.

== Definition ==
An element p of a commutative ring R is said to be prime if it is not the zero element or a unit, and for all a, b in R, whenever p divides ab, p divides a or p divides b (that is, $p\mid ab \implies p\mid a\ \or\ p\mid b$). With this definition, Euclid's lemma is the assertion that prime numbers are prime elements in the ring of integers. Equivalently, an element p is prime if, and only if, the principal ideal (p) generated by p is a nonzero prime ideal. (In an integral domain, the ideal (0) is a prime ideal, but 0 is not considered to be a prime element.) Note: References defining primality for an element $p\in R$ often restrict R to be an integral domain or a Euclidean domain, or may add the additional requirement that p is not a zero-divisor.

Interest in prime elements comes from the fundamental theorem of arithmetic, which asserts that each nonzero integer can be written in essentially only one way as 1 or −1 multiplied by a product of positive prime numbers. This led to the study of unique factorization domains, which generalize what was just illustrated in the integers.

Being prime is relative to which ring an element is considered to be in; for example, 2 is a prime element in Z but it is not in Z[i], the ring of Gaussian integers, since 2 = (1 + i)(1 − i) and 2 does not divide any factor on the right.

== Connection with prime ideals ==
An ideal I in the ring R (with unity) is prime if the factor ring R/I is an integral domain. Equivalently, I is prime if whenever $ab \in I$ then either $a \in I$ or $b \in I$.

A nonzero principal ideal is prime if and only if it is generated by a prime element.

== Irreducible elements ==
Prime elements should not be confused with irreducible elements. Recall that an element a of an integral domain R is irreducible if it is not a unit and whenever a = bc, either b or c is a unit, while several non-equivalent definitions of irreducibility of varying strength exist for elements of general commutative rings (see the main article). In an integral domain, every prime is irreducible but the converse is not true in general. However, in unique factorization domains, or more generally in GCD domains, primes and irreducibles are the same.

== Examples ==
The following are examples of prime elements in rings:

- The integers ±2, ±3, ±5, ±7, ±11, ... in the ring of integers Z
- the complex numbers (1 + i), 19, and (2 + 3i) in the ring of Gaussian integers Z[i]
- the polynomials x^{2} − 2 and x^{2} + 1 in Z[x], the ring of polynomials over Z.
- 2 in the quotient ring Z/6Z
- x^{2} + (x^{2} + x) is prime but not irreducible in the ring Q[x]/(x^{2} + x)
- In the ring Z^{2} of pairs of integers, (1, 0) is prime but not irreducible (one has (1, 0)^{2} = (1, 0)).
- In the ring of algebraic integers $\mathbf Z[\sqrt{-5}],$ the element 3 is irreducible but not prime (as 3 divides $9=(2+\sqrt{-5})(2-\sqrt{-5})$ and 3 does not divide any factor on the right).
