= Fundamental theorem of arithmetic =

Integers have unique prime factorizations

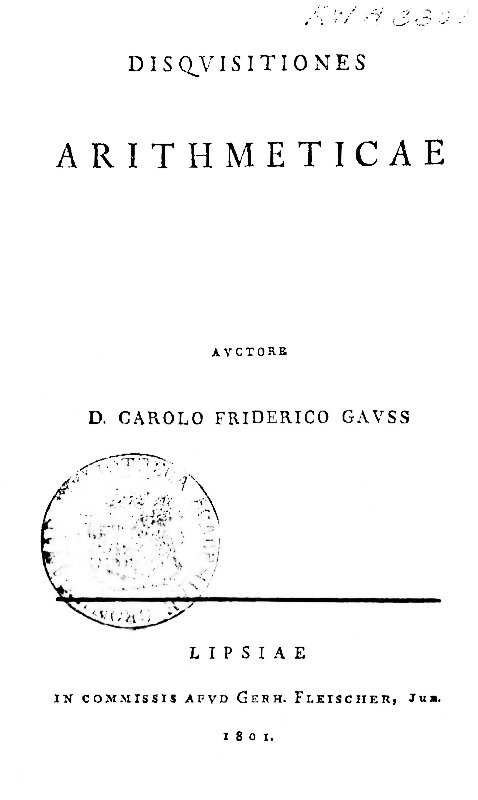
In Disquisitiones Arithmeticae (1801) Gauss proved the unique factorization theorem and used it to prove the law of quadratic reciprocity.

In mathematics, the fundamental theorem of arithmetic, also called the unique factorization theorem and prime factorization theorem, states that every integer greater than 1 is either prime or can be represented uniquely as a product of prime numbers, up to the order of the factors. For example,
$$1200 = 2^4 \cdot 3^1 \cdot 5^2 = (2 \cdot 2 \cdot 2 \cdot 2) \cdot 3 \cdot (5 \cdot 5) = 5 \cdot 2 \cdot 5 \cdot 2 \cdot 3 \cdot 2 \cdot 2 = \ldots$$

The theorem says two things about this example: first, that 1200 can be represented as a product of primes, and second, that no matter how this is done, there will always be exactly four 2s, one 3, two 5s, and no other primes in the product.

The requirement that the factors be prime is necessary: factorizations containing composite numbers may not be unique (for example, $12 = 2 \cdot 6 = 3 \cdot 4$).

Using the standard conventions for the product of a sequence (the value of the empty product is 1 and the product of a single factor is the factor itself), the theorem is often stated as: every positive integer can be represented uniquely as a product of prime numbers, up to the order of the factors.

This theorem is one of the main reasons why 1 is not considered a prime number: if 1 were prime, then factorization into primes would not be unique; for example, $2 = 2 \cdot 1 = 2 \cdot 1 \cdot 1 = \ldots$

The theorem generalizes to other algebraic structures that are called unique factorization domains and include principal ideal domains, Euclidean domains, and polynomial rings over a field. However, the theorem does not hold for algebraic integers. (Note: In a ring of algebraic integers, the factorization into prime elements may be non unique, but one can recover a unique factorization if one factors into ideals.) This failure of unique factorization is one of the reasons for the difficulty of the proof of Fermat's Last Theorem. The implicit use of unique factorization in rings of algebraic integers is behind the error of many of the numerous false proofs that have been written during the 358 years between Fermat's statement and Wiles's proof.

== History ==
The fundamental theorem can be derived from Book VII, propositions 30, 31 and 32, and Book IX, proposition 14 of Euclid's Elements.

If two numbers by multiplying one another make some number, and any prime number measure the product, it will also measure one of the original numbers.

— Euclid, Elements Book VII, Proposition 30,

(In modern terminology: if a prime p divides the product ab, then p divides either a or b or both.) Proposition 30 is referred to as Euclid's lemma, and it is the key in the proof of the fundamental theorem of arithmetic.

Any composite number is measured by some prime number.

— Euclid, Elements Book VII, Proposition 31,

(In modern terminology: every integer greater than one is divided evenly by some prime number.) Proposition 31 is proved directly by infinite descent.

Any number either is prime or is measured by some prime number.

— Euclid, Elements Book VII, Proposition 32,

Proposition 32 is derived from proposition 31, and proves that the decomposition is possible.

If a number be the least that is measured by prime numbers, it will not be measured by any other prime number except those originally measuring it.

— Euclid, Elements Book IX, Proposition 14,

(In modern terminology: a least common multiple of several prime numbers is not a multiple of any other prime number.) Book IX, proposition 14 is derived from Book VII, proposition 30, and proves partially that the decomposition is unique – a point critically noted by André Weil. (Note: Weil 2007, p. 5: "Even in Euclid, we fail to find a general statement about the uniqueness of the factorization of an integer into primes; surely he may have been aware of it, but all he has is a statement (Eucl.IX.I4) about the l.c.m. of any number of given primes.") Indeed, in this proposition the exponents are all equal to one, so nothing is said for the general case.

While Euclid took the first step on the way to the existence of prime factorization, Kamāl al-Dīn al-Fārisī took the final step (Note: Ağargün & Özkan 2001, p. 209: "One could say that Euclid takes the first step on the way to the existence of prime factorization, and al-Farisi takes the final step by actually proving the existence of a finite prime factorization in his first proposition.") and stated for the first time the fundamental theorem of arithmetic. (Note: Rashed 2002, p. 385: "The famous physicist and mathematician Kamal al-Din al-Farisi compiled a paper in which he set out deliberately to prove the theorem of Ibn Qurra in an algebraic way. This forced him to an understanding of the first arithmetical functions and to a full preparation which led him to state for the first time the fundamental theorem of arithmetic.")

Article 16 of Gauss's Disquisitiones Arithmeticae seems to be the first proof of the uniqueness part of the theorem.

== Applications ==
=== Canonical representation of a positive integer ===
Every positive integer n > 1 can be represented in exactly one way as a product of prime powers

$$n = p_1^{n_1}p_2^{n_2} \cdots p_k^{n_k}
= \prod_{i=1}^{k} p_i^{n_i},$$

where p_{1} < p_{2} < ... < p_{k} are primes and the n_{i} are positive integers. This representation is commonly extended to all positive integers, including 1, by the convention that the empty product is equal to 1 (the empty product corresponds to k = 0).

This representation is called the canonical representation of n, or the standard form of n. For example,

999 = 3^{3}×37,
1000 = 2^{3}×5^{3},
1001 = 7×11×13.

Factors p^{0} = 1 may be inserted without changing the value of n (for example, 1000 = 2^{3}×3^{0}×5^{3}). In fact, any positive integer can be uniquely represented as an infinite product taken over all the positive prime numbers, as

$$n=2^{n_1}3^{n_2}5^{n_3}7^{n_4}\cdots=\prod_{i=1}^\infty p_i^{n_i},$$

where a finite number of the n_{i} are positive integers, and the others are zero.

Allowing negative exponents provides a canonical form for positive rational numbers.

=== Arithmetic operations ===
The canonical representations of the product, greatest common divisor (GCD), and least common multiple (LCM) of two numbers a and b can be expressed simply in terms of the canonical representations of a and b themselves:

$$\begin{alignat}{2}
a\cdot b & = 2^{a_1+b_1}3^{a_2+b_2}5^{a_3+b_3}7^{a_4+b_4}\cdots
&& = \prod p_i^{a_i+b_i},\\
\gcd(a,b) & = 2^{\min(a_1,b_1)}3^{\min(a_2,b_2)}5^{\min(a_3,b_3)}7^{\min(a_4,b_4)}\cdots
&& = \prod p_i^{\min(a_i,b_i)},\\
\operatorname{lcm}(a,b) & = 2^{\max(a_1,b_1)}3^{\max(a_2,b_2)}5^{\max(a_3,b_3)}7^{\max(a_4,b_4)}\cdots
&& = \prod p_i^{\max(a_i,b_i)}.
\end{alignat}$$

However, integer factorization, especially of large numbers, is much more difficult than computing products, GCDs, or LCMs, so these formulas have limited use in practice.

=== Arithmetic functions ===
Many arithmetic functions are defined using the canonical representation. In particular, the values of additive and multiplicative functions are determined by their values on the powers of prime numbers.

== Proof ==
The proof of uniqueness uses Euclid's lemma (Elements VII, 30): If a prime divides the product of two integers, then it must divide at least one of these integers.

=== Existence ===
It must be shown that every integer greater than 1 is either prime or a product of primes. Let n be an integer greater than 1 and make the inductive assumption that every integer greater than 1 and less than n is either prime or a product of primes. If n is prime, there is nothing more to prove. Otherwise, there are integers a and b, where n = a b, and 1 < a ≤ b < n. By the inductive hypothesis, a = p_{1} p_{2} ⋅⋅⋅ p_{j} and b = q_{1} q_{2} ⋅⋅⋅ q_{k} are products of primes. But then n = a b = p_{1} p_{2} ⋅⋅⋅ p_{j} q_{1} q_{2} ⋅⋅⋅ q_{k} is a product of primes.

=== Uniqueness ===
Suppose, to the contrary, there is an integer that has two distinct prime factorizations. Let n be the least such integer and write n = p_{1} p_{2} ... p_{j} = q_{1} q_{2} ... q_{k}, where each p_{i} and q_{i} is prime. We see that p_{1} divides q_{1} q_{2} ... q_{k}, so p_{1} divides some q_{i} by Euclid's lemma. Without loss of generality, say p_{1} divides q_{1}. Since p_{1} and q_{1} are both prime, it follows that p_{1} = q_{1}. Returning to our factorizations of n, we may cancel these two factors to conclude that p_{2} ... p_{j} = q_{2} ... q_{k}. We now have two distinct prime factorizations of some integer strictly smaller than n, which contradicts the minimality of n.

=== Uniqueness without Euclid's lemma ===
The fundamental theorem of arithmetic can also be proved without using Euclid's lemma The proof that follows is inspired by Euclid's original version of the Euclidean algorithm.

Assume that $s$ is the smallest positive integer which is the product of prime numbers in two different ways. Incidentally, this implies that $s$, if it exists, must be a composite number greater than $1$. Now, say

$$\begin{align}
s
&=p_1 p_2 \cdots p_m \\
&=q_1 q_2 \cdots q_n.
\end{align}$$

Every $p_i$ must be distinct from every $q_j.$ Otherwise, if say $p_i=q_j,$ then there would exist some positive integer $t=s/p_i=s/q_j$ that is smaller than s and has two distinct prime factorizations. One may also suppose that $p_1 < q_1,$ by exchanging the two factorizations, if needed.

Setting $P=p_2\cdots p_m$ and $Q=q_2\cdots q_n,$ one has $s=p_1P=q_1Q.$ Also, since $p_1 < q_1,$ one has $Q < P.$ It then follows that

$$s-p_1Q = (q_1-p_1)Q = p_1(P-Q) < s.$$

As the positive integers less than s have been supposed to have a unique prime factorization, $p_1$ must occur in the factorization of either $q_1-p_1$ or Q. The latter case is impossible, as Q, being smaller than s, must have a unique prime factorization, and $p_1$ differs from every $q_j.$ The former case is also impossible, as, if $p_1$ is a divisor of $q_1-p_1,$ it must be also a divisor of $q_1,$ which is impossible as $p_1$ and $q_1$ are distinct primes.

Therefore, there cannot exist a smallest integer with more than a single distinct prime factorization. Every positive integer must either be a prime number itself, which would factor uniquely, or a composite that also factors uniquely into primes, or in the case of the integer $1$, not factor into any prime.

== Generalizations ==
The first generalization of the theorem is found in Gauss's second monograph (1832) on biquadratic reciprocity. This paper introduced what is now called the ring of Gaussian integers, the set of all complex numbers a + bi where a and b are integers. It is now denoted by $\mathbb{Z}[i].$ He showed that this ring has the four units ±1 and ±i, that the non-zero, non-unit numbers fall into two classes, primes and composites, and that the composites have unique factorization as a product of primes (up to the order and multiplication by units).

Similarly, in 1844 while working on cubic reciprocity, Eisenstein introduced the ring $\mathbb{Z}[\omega]$, where $\omega = \frac{-1 + \sqrt{-3}}{2}$ is a cube root of unity (that is, $\omega^3 = 1$). This is the ring of Eisenstein integers, and he proved it has the six units $\pm 1, \pm\omega, \pm\omega^2$ and that it has unique factorization.

However, it was also discovered that unique factorization does not always hold. An example is given by $\mathbb{Z}[\sqrt{-5}]$. In this ring one has

$$6 =
2 \cdot 3 =
\left(1 + \sqrt{-5}\right)\left(1 - \sqrt{-5}\right).$$

Examples like this caused the notion of "prime" to be modified. In $\mathbb{Z}\left[\sqrt{-5}\right]$ it can be proven that if any of the factors above can be represented as a product, for example, 2 = ab, then one of a or b must be a unit. This is the traditional definition of "prime". It can also be proven that none of these factors obeys Euclid's lemma; for example, 2 divides neither $(1 +\sqrt{-5})$ nor $(1 - \sqrt{-5})$ even though it divides their product 6. In algebraic number theory 2 is called irreducible in $\mathbb{Z}\left[\sqrt{-5}\right]$ (only divisible by itself or a unit) but not prime in $\mathbb{Z}\left[\sqrt{-5}\right]$ (if it divides a product it must divide one of the factors). The mention of $\mathbb{Z}\left[\sqrt{-5}\right]$ is required because 2 is prime and irreducible in $\mathbb{Z}.$ Using these definitions it can be proven that in any integral domain a prime must be irreducible. Euclid's classical lemma can be rephrased as "in the ring of integers $\mathbb{Z}$ every irreducible is prime". This is also true in $\mathbb{Z}[i]$ and $\mathbb{Z}[\omega],$ but not in $\mathbb{Z}[\sqrt{-5}].$

The rings in which factorization into irreducibles is essentially unique are called unique factorization domains. Important examples are polynomial rings over the integers or over a field, Euclidean domains and principal ideal domains.

In 1843 Kummer introduced the concept of ideal number, which was developed further by Dedekind (1876) into the modern theory of ideals, special subsets of rings. Multiplication is defined for ideals, and the rings in which they have unique factorization are called Dedekind domains.

There is a version of unique factorization for ordinals, though it requires some additional conditions to ensure uniqueness.

== See also ==
- Integer factorization
- List of theorems called fundamental
- Prime signature, a characterization of how many primes divide a given number
