= Paul Cohn =

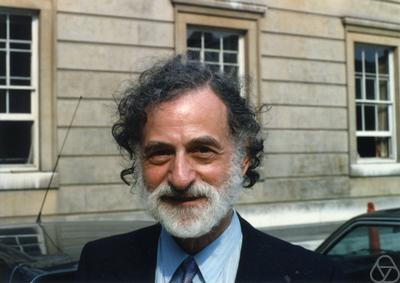
- Paul Cohn in 1989
- Born: Paul Moritz Cohn; 8 January 1924; Hamburg, Germany
- Died: 20 April 2006 (aged 82); London, England
- Education: University of Cambridge
- Known for: Algebra, concentrating in non-commutative rings
- Awards: Lester R. Ford Award (1972); Senior Berwick Prize (1974); Fellow of the Royal Society (1980)
- Scientific career
- Fields: Mathematics
- Workplaces: University College London; Bedford College, London
- Doctoral advisor: Philip Hall

Paul Moritz Cohn FRS (8 January 1924 – 20 April 2006) was Astor Professor of Mathematics at University College London, 1986–1989, and author of many textbooks on algebra. His work was mostly in the area of algebra, especially non-commutative rings.

== Early life ==
Cohn was the only child of Jewish parents, James (or Jakob) Cohn, owner of an import business, and Julia (née Cohen), a schoolteacher.

Both of his parents were born in Hamburg, as were three of his grandparents. His ancestors came from various parts of Germany. His father fought in the German army in World War I; he was wounded several times and awarded the Iron Cross. A street in Hamburg is named in memory of his mother.

When he was born, his parents were living with his mother's mother in Isestraße. After her death in October 1925, the family moved to a rented flat in a new building in Lattenkamp, in the Winterhude quarter. He attended a kindergarten then, in April 1930, moved to Alsterdorfer Straße School. After a while, he had a new teacher, a National Socialist, who picked on him and punished him without cause. Thus in 1931, he moved to the Meerweinstraße School where his mother taught.

Following the rise of the Nazis in 1933, his father's business was confiscated and his mother dismissed. He moved to the Talmud-Tora-Schule, a Jewish school. In mid-1937, the family moved to Klosterallee. This was nearer the school, the synagogue and other pupils, being in the Jewish area. His German teacher was Dr. Ernst Loewenberg, the son of the poet Jakob Loewenberg.

On the night of 9/10 November 1938 (Kristallnacht), his father was arrested and sent to Sachsenhausen concentration camp. He was released after four months but told to emigrate. Cohn went to Britain in May 1939 on the Kindertransport to work on a chicken farm, and never saw his parents again. He corresponded regularly with them until late 1941. At the end of the War, he learned that they were deported to Riga on 6 December 1941 and never returned. At the end of 1941, the farm closed. He trained as a precision engineer, acquired a work permit and worked in a factory for 4½ years. He passed the Cambridge Scholarship Examination, and won an exhibition to Trinity College, Cambridge.

== Career ==
He received a B.A in mathematics from Cambridge University in 1948 and a Ph.D. (supervised by Philip Hall) in 1951. He then spent a year as a Chargé de Recherches at the University of Nancy. On his return, he became a lecturer in mathematics at Manchester University. He was a visiting professor at Yale University in 1961–1962, and for part of 1962 was at the University of California at Berkeley. On his return, he became Reader at Queen Mary College. He was a visiting professor at the University of Chicago in 1964 and at the State University of New York at Stony Brook in 1967. By then, he was regarded as one of the world's leading algebraists.

Also in 1967, he became head of the Department of Mathematics at Bedford College, London. He held several visiting professorships, in America, Paris, Delhi, Canada, Haifa and Bielefeld. He was awarded the Lester R. Ford Award from the Mathematical Association of America in 1972 and the Senior Berwick Prize of the London Mathematical Society in 1974.

In the early 1980s, funding cuts caused the closure of the small colleges of the University of London. Cohn moved to University College London in 1984, together with the two other experts at Bedford on ring theory, Bill Stephenson and Warren Dicks. He became Astor Professor of Mathematics there in 1986. He continued to be a visiting professor, for example to the University of Alberta in 1986 and to Bar Ilan University in 1987. He retired in 1989, but remained active as professor emeritus and honorary research fellow until his death.

He was president of the London Mathematical Society, 1982–1984, having been its secretary, 1965–1967 and a council member in 1968–1971, 1972–1975 and 1979–1982. He was editor of the society's monographs in 1968–1977 and 1980–1993. He was elected a Fellow of the Royal Society in 1980 and was on its council, 1985–1987. He was a member of the Mathematical Committee of the Science Research Council, 1977–1980. He chaired the National Committee for Mathematics, 1988–1989.

== Mathematical work ==
In all, Cohn wrote nearly 200 mathematical papers. He worked in many areas of algebra, mainly in non-commutative ring theory. His first papers, covering many topics, were published in 1952. He generalised a theorem due to Wilhelm Magnus, and worked on the structure of tensor spaces. In 1953 he published a joint paper with Kurt Mahler on pseudo-valuations and in 1954 he published a work on Lie algebras. Papers over the next few years covered areas such as group theory, field theory, Lie rings, semigroups, abelian groups and ring theory. After that, he moved into the areas of Jordan algebras, skew fields, and non-commutative unique factorisation domains.

In 1957 Cohn published his first book, Lie Groups, on groups that are analytic manifolds: Lie groups. His second book, Linear Equations, appeared in 1958 and his third, Solid geometry, in 1961. Universal algebra appeared in 1965 (second edition 1981). After that, he concentrated on non-commutative ring theory and the theory of algebras. His monograph Free Rings and their Relations appeared in 1971. It covered the work of Cohn and others on free associative algebras and related classes of rings, especially free ideal rings. He included all of his own published results on the embedding of rings into skew fields. The second, enlarged edition appeared in 1985.

Cohn also wrote undergraduate textbooks. Algebra I appeared in 1974 and Algebra II in 1977. The second edition, in three volumes, was published by Wiley between 1982 and 1991. These volumes were in line with the British (rather than American) curricula at the time and include both linear algebra and abstract algebra. Cohn wrote a subsequent revised iteration of the first volume as Classic Algebra (Wiley, 2000) as a more "user friendly" version for undergraduates (according to its preface); this book also includes a few selected topics from volumes II and III of Algebra.

The final incarnation of Cohn's algebra textbooks appeared in 2003 as two Springer volumes Basic Algebra and Further Algebra and Applications. The material in Basic Algebra is (according to its preface) rather more concise and, while corresponding roughly with Algebra I, assumes knowledge of linear algebra. The material on basic theories (groups, rings, fields) is pursued in more depth in Basic Algebra compared to Algebra I. Further Algebra and Applications roughly corresponds to volumes II and III of Algebra, but reflects the shift of some material from these volumes to Basic Algebra.

== Private life ==
His recreation was etymology and language in all its forms. He married Deirdre Sharon in 1958, and they had two daughters.

== Publications ==
=== Articles ===
- Cohn, P. M. (1952). "Generalization of a theorem of Magnus". Proceedings of the London Mathematical Society. Third Series. 2: 297–310. Zbl 0047.02501.
- Cohn, P. M. (1958). "Rings of zero-divisors". Proceedings of the American Mathematical Society. 9 (6): 909–914. doi:10.1090/s0002-9939-1958-0103202-2. MR 0103202.
- Cohn, P. M. (1963). "Noncommutative unique factorization domains". Transactions of the American Mathematical Society. 109 (2): 313–331. doi:10.1090/s0002-9947-1963-0155851-x. MR 0155851.
- Cohn, P. M. (1963). "Rings with a weak algorithm". Trans. Amer. Math. Soc. 109 (2): 332–356. doi:10.1090/s0002-9947-1963-0153696-8. MR 0153696.
- 1995: "Skew Fields, Theory of General Division Rings", Encyclopedia of Mathematics and its Applications vol 57
- Cohn, P. M. (2000). "From Hermite rings to Sylvester domains". Proc. Amer. Math. Soc. 128 (7): 1899–1904. doi:10.1090/s0002-9939-99-05189-8. MR 1646314.

=== Books ===
- 1957: Lie Groups
- 1958: Linear Equations
- 1961: Solid Geometry
- 1965: Universal Algebra, second edition 1981
- 1971: Free Rings and Their Relations second edition 1985
- 1974: Algebra I, second edition 1982
- 1977: Algebra II, second edition 1989
- 1977: Skew Field Constructions
- 1990: Algebra III
- 1991: Algebraic Numbers and Algebraic Functions
- 1994: Elements of Linear Algebra
- 2000: Introduction to Ring Theory
- 2000: Classic Algebra
- 2002: Basic Algebra
- 2003: Further Algebra and Applications
- 2004: Oxford Dictionary of National Biography (contributor)
- 2006: Free Ideal Rings and Localization in General Rings

== Bibliography ==
- Cohn, Paul; Struan Robertson (website owner) (February 2003). "Paul M. Cohn, (Childhood in Hamburg)" (Autobiography). A History of Jews in Hamburg: The Kindertransports.
- Cooper, P. R. (ed.). "Paul M. Cohn" (PDF). London Mathematical Society: Newsletter. No. 350. Council for the Mathematical Sciences. p. 8. Archived (PDF) from the original on 24 January 2021.
- Schofield, Aidan (8 August 2006). "Professor Paul Cohn" (Newspaper obituary). The Independent.
- "Professor Paul Cohn: Mathematician who devoted himself to algebra" (Newspaper obituary). The Times. 29 June 2006.
