= Unique factorization domain =

Type of integral domain

In mathematics, a unique factorization domain (UFD) (also sometimes called a factorial ring following the terminology of Bourbaki) is a ring in which a statement analogous to the fundamental theorem of arithmetic holds. Specifically, a UFD is an integral domain (a nontrivial commutative ring in which the product of any two non-zero elements is non-zero) in which every non-zero non-unit element can be written as a product of irreducible elements, uniquely up to order and units.

Important examples of UFDs are the integers and polynomial rings in one or more variables with coefficients coming from the integers or from a field.

Unique factorization domains appear in the following chain of class inclusions:

rngs ⊃ rings ⊃ commutative rings ⊃ integral domains ⊃ integrally closed domains ⊃ GCD domains ⊃ unique factorization domains ⊃ principal ideal domains ⊃ Euclidean domains ⊃ fields ⊃ algebraically closed fields

== Definition ==
Formally, a unique factorization domain is defined to be an integral domain R in which every non-zero element x of R which is not a unit can be written as a finite product of irreducible elements p_{i} of R:

x = p_{1} p_{2} ⋅⋅⋅ p_{n} with n ≥ 1

and this representation is unique in the following sense: If q_{1}, ..., q_{m} are irreducible elements of R such that

x = q_{1} q_{2} ⋅⋅⋅ q_{m} with m ≥ 1,

then m = n, and there exists a bijective map φ : {1, ..., n} → {1, ..., m} such that p_{i} is associated to q_{φ(i)} for i ∈ {1, ..., n}.

== Examples ==
Most rings familiar from elementary mathematics are UFDs:

- All principal ideal domains, hence all Euclidean domains, are UFDs. In particular, the integers (also see Fundamental theorem of arithmetic), the Gaussian integers and the Eisenstein integers are UFDs.
- If R is a UFD, then so is R[X], the ring of polynomials with coefficients in R. Unless R is a field, R[X] is not a principal ideal domain. By induction, a polynomial ring in any number of variables over any UFD (and in particular over a field or over the integers) is a UFD.
- The formal power series ring K[[X_{1}, ..., X_{n}]] over a field K (or more generally over a regular UFD such as a PID) is a UFD. On the other hand, the formal power series ring over a UFD need not be a UFD, even if the UFD is local. For example, if R is the localization of k[x, y, z]/(x^{2} + y^{3} + z^{7}) at the prime ideal (x, y, z) then R is a local ring that is a UFD, but the formal power series ring R[[X]] over R is not a UFD.
- The Auslander–Buchsbaum theorem states that every regular local ring is a UFD.
- $\textstyle \mathbb{Z}\bigl[e^{2 \pi i/n}\bigr]$ is a UFD for all integers 1 ≤ n ≤ 22, but not for n = 23. This is the ring of integers of the cyclotomic field $\mathbb{Q}(e^{2 \pi i/n})$. For rings of integers of other number fields, see List of number fields with class number one.
- Mori showed that if the completion of a Zariski ring, such as a Noetherian local ring, is a UFD, then the ring is a UFD. The converse of this is not true: there are Noetherian local rings that are UFDs but whose completions are not. The question of when this happens is rather subtle: for example, for the localization of k[x, y, z]/(x^{2} + y^{3} + z^{5}) at the prime ideal (x, y, z), both the local ring and its completion are UFDs, but in the apparently similar example of the localization of k[x, y, z]/(x^{2} + y^{3} + z^{7}) at the prime ideal (x, y, z) the local ring is a UFD but its completion is not.
- Let $R$ be a field of any characteristic other than 2. Klein and Nagata showed that the ring R[X_{1}, ..., X_{n}]/Q is a UFD whenever Q is a nonsingular quadratic form in the Xs and n is at least 5. When n = 4, the ring need not be a UFD. For example, R[X, Y, Z, W]/(XY − ZW) is not a UFD, because the element XY equals the element ZW so that XY and ZW are two different factorizations of the same element into irreducibles.
- The ring Q[x, y]/(x^{2} + 2y^{2} + 1) is a UFD, but the ring Q(i)[x, y]/(x^{2} + 2y^{2} + 1) is not. On the other hand, The ring Q[x, y]/(x^{2} + y^{2} − 1) is not a UFD, but the ring Q(i)[x, y]/(x^{2} + y^{2} − 1) is. Similarly the coordinate ring R[X, Y, Z]/(X^{2} + Y^{2} + Z^{2} − 1) of the 2-dimensional real sphere is a UFD, but the coordinate ring C[X, Y, Z]/(X^{2} + Y^{2} + Z^{2} − 1) of the complex sphere is not.
- Suppose that the variables X_{i} are given weights w_{i}, and F(X_{1}, ..., X_{n}) is a homogeneous polynomial of weight w. Then if c is coprime to w and R is a UFD and either every finitely generated projective module over R is free or c is 1 mod w, the ring R[X_{1}, ..., X_{n}, Z]/(Z^{c} − F(X_{1}, ..., X_{n})) is a UFD.

=== Non-examples ===
- The quadratic integer ring $\mathbb Z[\sqrt{-5}]$ of all complex numbers of the form $a+b\sqrt{-5}$, where a and b are integers, is not a UFD because 6 factors as both 2×3 and as $\left(1+\sqrt{-5}\right)\left(1-\sqrt{-5}\right)$. These truly are different factorizations, because the only units in this ring are 1 and −1; thus, none of 2, 3, $1+\sqrt{-5}$, and $1-\sqrt{-5}$ are associate. It is not hard to show that all four factors are irreducible as well, though this may not be obvious. See also Algebraic integer.
- For a square-free positive integer d, the ring of integers of $\mathbb Q[\sqrt{-d}]$ will fail to be a UFD unless d is one of the nine Heegner numbers.
- The ring of formal power series over the complex numbers is a UFD, but the subring of those that converge everywhere, in other words the ring of entire functions in a single complex variable, is not a UFD, since there exist entire functions with an infinity of zeros, and thus an infinity of irreducible factors, while a UFD factorization must be finite, e.g.:
  $$\sin \pi z = \pi z \prod_{n=1}^{\infty} \left(1-{{z^2}\over{n^2}}\right).$$

== Properties ==
Some concepts defined for integers can be generalized to UFDs:

- In UFDs, every irreducible element is prime. (In any integral domain, every prime element is irreducible, but the converse does not always hold. For instance, the element z ∈ K[x, y, z]/(z^{2} − xy) is irreducible, but not prime.) Note that this has a partial converse: a domain satisfying the ACCP is a UFD if and only if every irreducible element is prime.
- Any two elements of a UFD have a greatest common divisor and a least common multiple. Here, a greatest common divisor of a and b is an element d that divides both a and b, and such that every other common divisor of a and b divides d. All greatest common divisors of a and b are associated.
- Any UFD is integrally closed. In other words, if R is a UFD with quotient field K, and if an element k in K is a root of a monic polynomial with coefficients in R, then k is an element of R.
- Let S be a multiplicatively closed subset of a UFD A not containing 0. Then the localization S^{−1}A is a UFD. A partial converse to this also holds; see below.

== Equivalent conditions for a ring to be a UFD ==
A Noetherian integral domain is a UFD if and only if every height 1 prime ideal is principal (a proof is given at the end). Also, a Dedekind domain is a UFD if and only if its ideal class group is trivial. In this case, it is in fact a principal ideal domain.

In general, for an integral domain A, the following conditions are equivalent:

1. A is a UFD.
2. Every nonzero prime ideal of A contains a prime element. (Note: Kaplansky)
3. A satisfies ascending chain condition on principal ideals (ACCP), and the localization S^{−1}A is a UFD, where S is a multiplicatively closed subset of A generated by prime elements. (Nagata criterion)
4. A satisfies ACCP and every irreducible is prime.
5. A is atomic and every irreducible is prime.
6. A is a GCD domain satisfying ACCP.
7. A is a Schreier domain, and atomic.
8. A is a pre-Schreier domain and atomic.
9. A has a divisor theory in which every divisor is principal.
10. A is a Krull domain in which every divisorial ideal is principal (in fact, this is the definition of UFD in Bourbaki.)
11. A is a Krull domain and every prime ideal of height 1 is principal.

In practice, (2) and (3) are the most useful conditions to check. For example, it follows immediately from (2) that a PID is a UFD, since every prime ideal is generated by a prime element in a PID.

For another example, consider a Noetherian integral domain in which every height one prime ideal is principal. Since every prime ideal has finite height, it contains a height one prime ideal (induction on height) that is principal. By (2), the ring is a UFD.

== See also ==
- Parafactorial local ring
- Noncommutative unique factorization domain
