= Irreducible element =

In algebra, element without non-trivial factors

In algebra, an irreducible element of an integral domain is a non-zero element that is not invertible (that is, is not a unit), and is not the product of two non-invertible elements.

The irreducible elements are the terminal elements of a factorization process; that is, they are the factors that cannot be further factorized. If the irreducible factors of every non-zero non-unit element are uniquely defined, up to the multiplication by a unit, then the integral domain is called a unique factorization domain, but this does not need to happen in general for every integral domain. It was discovered in the 19th century that the rings of integers of some number fields are not unique factorization domains, and, therefore, that some irreducible elements can appear in some factorization of an element and not in other factorizations of the same element. The ignorance of this fact is the main error in many of the wrong proofs of Fermat's Last Theorem that were given during the three centuries between Fermat's statement and Wiles's proof of Fermat's Last Theorem.

If $R$ is an integral domain, then $a$ is an irreducible element of $R$ if and only if, for all $b,c\in R$, the equation $a=bc$ implies that the ideal generated by $a$ is equal to the ideal generated by $b$ or equal to the ideal generated by $c$. This equivalence does not hold for general commutative rings, which is why the assumption of the ring having no nonzero zero divisors is commonly made in the definition of irreducible elements. It results also that there are several ways to extend the definition of an irreducible element to an arbitrary commutative ring.

== Definition in an integral domain ==
Let $R$ be an integral domain. An element $a \in R$ is irreducible if it is not a unit and whenever $a = bc$, either $b$ or $c$ is a unit.

== Definition in rings with zero divisors ==
Anderson and Valdes-Leon in 1996 defined irreducible elements in arbitrary commutative rings (potentially with zero divisors): they define elements to be very strongly irreducible, m-irreducible, strongly irreducible, and irreducible (in decreasing order of strength) based on different conditions on $b$ and $c$ (Theorem 2.13). All definitions require $a$ to be not a unit. Their very strongly irreducible corresponds to the definition above. The condition m-irreducible is that whenever $a = bc$, $(b) = (1)$ or $(b) = (a)$. The condition strongly irreducible is that whenever $a = bc$, $a$ is equivalent to either $b$ or $c$ up to multiplication by a unit. Finally their irreducible is the condition that, whenever $a = bc$, either $(a) = (b)$ or $(a) = (c)$.

== Relationship with prime elements ==
Irreducible elements should not be confused with prime elements. (A non-zero non-unit element $a$ in a commutative ring $R$ is called prime if, whenever $a \mid bc$ for some $b$ and $c$ in $R,$ then $a \mid b$ or $a \mid c.$) In an integral domain, every prime element is irreducible, (Note: Consider $p$ a prime element of $R$ and suppose $p=ab.$ Then $p \mid ab,$ so $p \mid a$ or $p \mid b.$ Say $p \mid a,$ so $a = pc$ for some $c \in R$. Then we have $p=ab=pcb,$ and so $p(1-cb)=0.$ Because $R$ is an integral domain we have $cb=1.$ Therefore $b$ is a unit and $p$ is irreducible.) but the converse is not true in general. The converse is true for unique factorization domains (or, more generally, GCD domains).

Moreover, while an ideal generated by a prime element is a prime ideal, it is not true in general that an ideal generated by an irreducible element is an irreducible ideal. However, if $D$ is a GCD domain and $x$ is an irreducible element of $D$, then as noted above $x$ is prime, and so the ideal generated by $x$ is a prime (hence irreducible) ideal of $D$.

== Example ==
In the quadratic integer ring $\mathbf{Z}[\sqrt{-5}],$ it can be shown using norm arguments that the number 3 is irreducible. However, it is not a prime element in this ring since, for example,

$$3 \mid \left(2 + \sqrt{-5}\right)\left(2 - \sqrt{-5}\right)=9,$$

but 3 does not divide either of the two factors.

== See also ==
- Irreducible polynomial
