= Algebraic integer =

Complex number that solves a monic polynomial with integer coefficients

In algebraic number theory, an algebraic integer is a complex number that is integral over the integers. That is, an algebraic integer is a complex root of some polynomial which is monic (its leading coefficient is 1) and has coefficients that are all integers. The set of all algebraic integers A is closed under addition, subtraction and multiplication and therefore is a commutative subring of the complex numbers.

The ring of integers of a number field K, denoted by O_{K}, is the intersection of K and A: it can also be characterized as the maximal order of the field K. Each algebraic integer belongs to the ring of integers of some number field. A number α is an algebraic integer if and only if the ring $\mathbb{Z}[\alpha]$ is finitely generated as an abelian group, which is to say, as a $\mathbb{Z}$-module.

== Definitions ==
The following are equivalent definitions of an algebraic integer. Let K be a number field (i.e., a finite extension of $\mathbb{Q}$, the field of rational numbers), in other words, $K = \Q(\theta)$ for some algebraic number $\theta \in \Complex$ by the primitive element theorem.

- α ∈ K is an algebraic integer if there exists a monic polynomial $f(x) \in \Z[x]$ such that f(α) = 0.
- α ∈ K is an algebraic integer if the minimal monic polynomial of α over $\mathbb{Q}$ is in $\Z[x]$.
- α ∈ K is an algebraic integer if $\Z[\alpha]$ is a finitely generated $\Z$-module.
- α ∈ K is an algebraic integer if there exists a non-zero finitely generated $\Z$-submodule $M \subset \Complex$ such that αM ⊆ M.

Algebraic integers are a special case of integral elements of a ring extension. In particular, an algebraic integer is an integral element of a finite extension $K / \mathbb{Q}$.

Note that if P(x) is a primitive polynomial that has integer coefficients but is not monic, and P is irreducible over $\mathbb{Q}$, then none of the roots of P are algebraic integers (but are algebraic numbers). Here primitive is used in the sense that the highest common factor of the coefficients of P is 1, which is weaker than requiring the coefficients to be pairwise relatively prime.

== Examples ==
- The only algebraic integers that are found in the set of rational numbers are the integers. In other words, the intersection of $\mathbb{Q}$ and A is exactly $\mathbb{Z}$. The rational number a/b is not an algebraic integer unless b divides a. The leading coefficient of the polynomial bx − a is the integer b.
- The square root $\sqrt{n}$ of a nonnegative integer n is an algebraic integer, but is irrational unless n is a perfect square.
- If d is a square-free integer then the extension $K = \mathbb{Q}(\sqrt{d}\,)$ is a quadratic field of rational numbers. The ring of algebraic integers O_{K} contains $\sqrt{d}$ since this is a root of the monic polynomial x^{2} − d. Moreover, if d ≡ 1 mod 4, then the element $\frac{1}{2}(1 + \sqrt{d}\,)$ is also an algebraic integer. It satisfies the polynomial x^{2} − x + 1/4(1 − d) where the constant term 1/4(1 − d) is an integer. The full ring of integers is generated by $\sqrt{d}$ or $\frac{1}{2}(1 + \sqrt{d}\,)$ respectively. See Quadratic integer for more.
- The ring of integers of the field $F = \Q[\alpha]$, α = ^{3}√m (where m is cube-free), has the following integral basis, writing m = hk^{2} for two square-free coprime integers h and k:
  $$\begin{cases}
1, \alpha, \dfrac{\alpha^2 \pm k^2 \alpha + k^2}{3k} & m \equiv \pm 1 \bmod 9 \\
1, \alpha, \dfrac{\alpha^2}k  & \text{otherwise}
\end{cases}$$
- If ζ_{n} is a primitive nth root of unity, then the ring of integers of the cyclotomic field $\Q(\zeta_n)$ is precisely $\Z[\zeta_n]$.
- If α is an algebraic integer then β = ^{n}√α is another algebraic integer. A polynomial for β is obtained by substituting x^{n} in the polynomial for α.

== Finite generation of ring extension ==
For any $\alpha$, the ring extension (in the sense that is equivalent to field extension) of the integers by α

$$\Z[\alpha] := \left\{\sum_{i=0}^n \alpha^i z_i \;\Big\vert\; z_i\in \Z, n\in \Z\right\}$$

is finitely generated if and only if $\alpha$ is an algebraic integer.

The proof is analogous to that of the corresponding fact regarding algebraic numbers, with $\Q$ there replaced by $\Z$ here, and the notion of field extension degree replaced by finite generation (using the fact that $\Z$ is finitely generated itself); the only required change is that only non-negative powers of α are involved in the proof.

The analogy is possible because both algebraic integers and algebraic numbers are defined as roots of monic polynomials over either $\Z$ or $\Q$, respectively.

== Ring ==
The sum, difference and product of two algebraic integers is an algebraic integer. In general their quotient is not. Thus the algebraic integers form a ring.

This can be shown analogously to the corresponding proof for algebraic numbers, using the integers $\Z$ instead of the rationals $\Q$.

One may also construct explicitly the monic polynomial involved, which is generally of higher degree than those of the original algebraic integers, by taking resultants and factoring. For example, if x^{2} − x − 1 = 0, y^{3} − y − 1 = 0 and z = xy, then eliminating x and y from z − xy = 0 and the polynomials satisfied by x and y using the resultant gives z^{6} − 3z^{4} − 4z^{3} + z^{2} + z − 1 = 0, which is irreducible, and is the monic equation satisfied by the product. (To see that the xy is a root of the x-resultant of z − xy and x^{2} − x − 1, one might use the fact that the resultant is contained in the ideal generated by its two input polynomials.)

=== Integral closure ===
Every root of a monic polynomial whose coefficients are algebraic integers is itself an algebraic integer. In other words, the algebraic integers form a ring that is integrally closed in any of its extensions.

Again, the proof is analogous to the corresponding proof for algebraic numbers being algebraically closed.

== Additional facts ==
- Any number constructible out of the integers with roots, addition, and multiplication is an algebraic integer; but not all algebraic integers are so constructible: in a naïve sense, most roots of irreducible quintics are not. This is the Abel–Ruffini theorem.
- The ring of algebraic integers is a Bézout domain, as a consequence of the principal ideal theorem.
- If the monic polynomial associated with an algebraic integer has constant term 1 or −1, then the reciprocal of that algebraic integer is also an algebraic integer, and each is a unit, an element of the group of units of the ring of algebraic integers.
- If x is an algebraic number then a_{n}x is an algebraic integer, where x satisfies a polynomial p(x) with integer coefficients and where a_{n}x^{n} is the highest-degree term of p(x). The value y = a_{n}x is an algebraic integer because it is a root of q(y) = a^{n − 1}_{n} p(y/a_{n}), where q(y) is a monic polynomial with integer coefficients.
- If x is an algebraic number then it can be written as the ratio of an algebraic integer to a non-zero algebraic integer. In fact, the denominator can always be chosen to be a positive integer. The ratio is |a_{n}|x / |a_{n}|, where x satisfies a polynomial p(x) with integer coefficients and where a_{n}x^{n} is the highest-degree term of p(x).
- The only rational algebraic integers are the integers. That is, if x is an algebraic integer and $x\in\Q$ then $x\in\Z$. This is a direct result of the rational root theorem for the case of a monic polynomial.

== See also ==
- Gaussian integer
- Eisenstein integer
- Root of unity
- Dirichlet's unit theorem
- Fundamental units
