= Morita equivalence =

Equivalence relation on rings

In abstract algebra, Morita equivalence is a relationship defined between rings that preserves many ring-theoretic properties. More precisely, two rings R, S are Morita equivalent (denoted by $R\approx S$) if their categories of modules are additively equivalent (denoted by ${}_{R}M\approx{}_{S}M$ (Note: It can be shown that this equivalence is left-right symmetric.)). It is named after Japanese mathematician Kiiti Morita who defined equivalence and a similar notion of duality in 1958.

== Motivation ==
Rings are commonly studied in terms of their modules, as modules can be viewed as representations of rings. Every ring R has a natural R-module structure on itself where the module action is defined as the multiplication in the ring, so the approach via modules is more general and gives useful information. Because of this, one often studies a ring by studying the category of modules over that ring. Morita equivalence takes this viewpoint to a natural conclusion by defining rings to be Morita equivalent if their module categories are equivalent. This notion is of interest only when dealing with noncommutative rings, since it can be shown that two commutative rings are Morita equivalent if and only if they are isomorphic.

== Definition ==
Two rings R and S (associative, with 1) are said to be (Morita) equivalent if there is an equivalence of the category of (left) modules over R, R-Mod, and the category of (left) modules over S, S-Mod. It can be shown that the left module categories R-Mod and S-Mod are equivalent if and only if the right module categories Mod-R and Mod-S are equivalent. Further it can be shown that any functor from R-Mod to S-Mod that yields an equivalence is automatically additive.

== Examples ==
Any two isomorphic rings are Morita equivalent.

The ring of n-by-n matrices with elements in R, denoted M_{n} R, is Morita-equivalent to R for any integer n > 0. Notice that this generalizes the classification of simple Artinian rings given by Artin–Wedderburn theory. To see the equivalence, notice that if X is a left R-module then X^{n} is an M_{n}(R)-module where the module structure is given by matrix multiplication on the left of column vectors from X. This allows the definition of a functor from the category of left R-modules to the category of left M_{n}(R)-modules. The inverse functor is defined by realizing that for any M_{n}(R)-module there is a left R-module X such that the M_{n}(R)-module is obtained from X as described above.

== Criteria for equivalence ==
Equivalences can be characterized as follows: if F : R-Mod $\to$ S-Mod and G : S-Mod $\to$ R-Mod are additive (covariant) functors, then F and G are an equivalence if and only if there is a balanced (S,R)-bimodule P such that _{S}P and P_{R} are finitely generated projective generators and there are natural isomorphisms of the functors $\operatorname{F}(-) \cong P_R \otimes_R -$, and of the functors $\operatorname{G}(-) \cong \operatorname{Hom}(_{S}P,-).$ Finitely generated projective generators are also sometimes called progenerators for their module category.

For every right-exact functor F from the category of left R-modules to the category of left S-modules that commutes with direct sums, a theorem of homological algebra shows that there is a (S,R)-bimodule E such that the functor $\operatorname{F}(-)$ is naturally isomorphic to the functor $E \otimes_R -$. Since equivalences are by necessity exact and commute with direct sums, this implies that R and S are Morita equivalent if and only if there are bimodules _{R}M_{S} and _{S}N_{R} such that $M \otimes_{S} N \cong R$ as (R,R)-bimodules and $N \otimes_{R} M \cong S$ as (S,S)-bimodules. Moreover, N and M are related via an (S,R)-bimodule isomorphism: $N \cong \operatorname{Hom}(M_S,S_S)$.

More concretely, two rings R and S are Morita equivalent if and only if $S\cong \operatorname{End}(P_R)$ for a progenerator module P_{R}, which is the case if and only if

$$S\cong e\mathbb{M}_{n}(R)e$$

(isomorphism of rings) for some positive integer n and full idempotent e in the matrix ring M_{n} R.

It is known that if R is Morita equivalent to S, then the ring Z(R) is isomorphic to the ring Z(S), where Z(-) denotes the center of the ring, and furthermore R/J(R) is Morita equivalent to S/J(S), where J(-) denotes the Jacobson radical.

While isomorphic rings are Morita equivalent, Morita equivalent rings can be nonisomorphic. An easy example is that a division ring D is Morita equivalent to all of its matrix rings M_{n} D, but cannot be isomorphic when n > 1. In the special case of commutative rings, Morita equivalent rings are actually isomorphic. This follows immediately from the comment above, for if R is Morita equivalent to S then $R = \operatorname{Z}(R) \cong \operatorname{Z}(S) = S$.

== Properties preserved by equivalence ==
Many properties are preserved by the equivalence functor for the objects in the module category. Generally speaking, any property of modules defined purely in terms of modules and their homomorphisms (and not to their underlying elements or ring) is a categorical property which will be preserved by the equivalence functor. For example, if F(-) is the equivalence functor from R-Mod to S-Mod, then the R module M has any of the following properties if and only if the S module F(M) does: injective, projective, flat, faithful, simple, semisimple, finitely generated, finitely presented, Artinian, and Noetherian. Examples of properties not necessarily preserved include being free, and being cyclic.

Many ring-theoretic properties are stated in terms of their modules, and so these properties are preserved between Morita equivalent rings. Properties shared between equivalent rings are called Morita invariant properties. For example, a ring R is semisimple if and only if all of its modules are semisimple, and since semisimple modules are preserved under Morita equivalence, an equivalent ring S must also have all of its modules semisimple, and therefore be a semisimple ring itself.

Sometimes it is not immediately obvious why a property should be preserved. For example, using one standard definition of von Neumann regular ring (for all a in R, there exists x in R such that a = axa) it is not clear that an equivalent ring should also be von Neumann regular. However another formulation is: a ring is von Neumann regular if and only if all of its modules are flat. Since flatness is preserved across Morita equivalence, it is now clear that von Neumann regularity is Morita invariant.

The following properties are Morita invariant:

- simple, semisimple
- von Neumann regular
- right (or left) Noetherian, right (or left) Artinian
- right (or left) self-injective
- quasi-Frobenius
- prime, right (or left) primitive, semiprime, semiprimitive
- right (or left) (semi-)hereditary
- right (or left) nonsingular
- right (or left) coherent
- semiprimary, right (or left) perfect, semiperfect
- semilocal

Examples of properties which are not Morita invariant include commutative, local, reduced, domain, right (or left) Goldie, Frobenius, invariant basis number, and Dedekind finite.

There are at least two other tests for determining whether or not a ring property $\mathcal{P}$ is Morita invariant. An element e in a ring R is a full idempotent when e^{2} = e and ReR = R.

- $\mathcal{P}$ is Morita invariant if and only if whenever a ring R satisfies $\mathcal{P}$, then so does eRe for every full idempotent e and so does every matrix ring M_{n} R for every positive integer n;

or

- $\mathcal{P}$ is Morita invariant if and only if: for any ring R and full idempotent e in R, R satisfies $\mathcal{P}$ if and only if the ring eRe satisfies $\mathcal{P}$.

== Further directions ==
Dual to the theory of equivalences is the theory of dualities between the module categories, where the functors used are contravariant rather than covariant. This theory, though similar in form, has significant differences because there is no duality between the categories of modules for any rings, although dualities may exist for subcategories. In other words, because infinite-dimensional modules are not generally reflexive, the theory of dualities applies more easily to finitely generated algebras over noetherian rings. Perhaps not surprisingly, the criterion above has an analogue for dualities, where the natural isomorphism is given in terms of the hom functor rather than the tensor functor.

Morita equivalence can also be defined in more structured situations, such as for symplectic groupoids and C*-algebras. In the case of C*-algebras, a stronger type equivalence, called strong Morita equivalence, is needed to obtain results useful in applications, because of the additional structure of C*-algebras (coming from the involutive *-operation) and also because C*-algebras do not necessarily have an identity element.

== Significance in K-theory ==
If two rings are Morita equivalent, there is an induced equivalence of the respective categories of projective modules since the Morita equivalences will preserve exact sequences (and hence projective modules). Since the algebraic K-theory of a ring is defined (in Quillen's approach) in terms of the homotopy groups of (roughly) the classifying space of the nerve of the (small) category of finitely generated projective modules over the ring, Morita equivalent rings must have isomorphic K-groups.
