= Ring theory =

Branch of algebra

In algebra, ring theory is the study of rings, algebraic structures in which addition and multiplication are defined and have similar properties to those operations defined for the integers. Ring theory studies the structure of rings; their representations, or, in different language, modules; special classes of rings (group rings, division rings, universal enveloping algebras); related structures like rngs; as well as an array of properties that prove to be of interest both within the theory itself and for its applications, such as homological properties and polynomial identities.

Commutative rings are much better understood than noncommutative ones. Algebraic geometry and algebraic number theory, which provide many natural examples of commutative rings, have driven much of the development of commutative ring theory, which is now, under the name of commutative algebra, a major area of modern mathematics. Because these three fields (algebraic geometry, algebraic number theory and commutative algebra) are so intimately connected, many results can be viewed as belonging to more than one of the three. For example, Hilbert's Nullstellensatz is a theorem which is fundamental for algebraic geometry, and is stated and proved in terms of commutative algebra. Similarly, Fermat's Last Theorem is stated in terms of elementary arithmetic, which is a part of commutative algebra, but its proof involves deep results of both algebraic number theory and algebraic geometry.

Noncommutative rings are quite different in flavour, since more unusual behavior can arise. While the theory has developed in its own right, a fairly recent trend has sought to parallel the commutative development by building the theory of certain classes of noncommutative rings in a geometric fashion as if they were rings of functions on (non-existent) 'noncommutative spaces'. This trend started in the 1980s with the development of noncommutative geometry and with the discovery of quantum groups. It has led to a better understanding of noncommutative rings, especially noncommutative Noetherian rings.

For the definitions of a ring and basic concepts and their properties, see Ring (mathematics). The definitions of terms used throughout ring theory may be found in Glossary of ring theory.

== Commutative rings ==
A ring is called commutative if its multiplication is commutative. Commutative rings resemble familiar number systems, and various definitions for commutative rings are designed to formalize properties of the integers. Important examples of commutative rings can be constructed as rings of polynomials and their factor rings; these examples are basic objects of study in algebraic geometry. In commutative ring theory, numbers are often replaced by ideals, and the definition of prime ideal tries to capture the essence of prime numbers. Integral domains, non-trivial commutative rings where no two non-zero elements multiply to give zero, generalize another property of the integers and serve as the proper realm to study divisibility. Principal ideal domains are integral domains in which every ideal can be generated by a single element, another property shared by the integers. Euclidean domains are integral domains in which the Euclidean algorithm can be carried out. The relations between these classes can be summarised as follows:

Euclidean domain ⊂ principal ideal domain ⊂ unique factorization domain ⊂ integral domain ⊂ commutative ring

=== Algebraic geometry ===
Algebraic geometry is in many ways the mirror image of commutative algebra. This correspondence started with Hilbert's Nullstellensatz that establishes a one-to-one correspondence between the points of an algebraic variety, and the maximal ideals of its coordinate ring. This correspondence has been enlarged and systematized for translating (and proving) most geometrical properties of algebraic varieties into algebraic properties of associated commutative rings. Alexander Grothendieck completed this by introducing schemes, a generalization of algebraic varieties, which may be built from any commutative ring. More precisely, the spectrum of a commutative ring is the space of its prime ideals equipped with Zariski topology, and augmented with a sheaf of rings. These objects are the "affine schemes" (generalization of affine varieties), and a general scheme is then obtained by "gluing together" (by purely algebraic methods) several such affine schemes, in analogy to the way of constructing a manifold by gluing together the charts of an atlas.

== Noncommutative rings ==
Noncommutative rings resemble rings of matrices in many respects. Following the model of algebraic geometry, attempts have been made recently at defining noncommutative geometry based on noncommutative rings. Noncommutative rings and associative algebras (rings that are also vector spaces) are often studied via their categories of modules. A module over a ring is an abelian group that the ring acts on as a ring of endomorphisms, very much akin to the way fields (integral domains in which every non-zero element is invertible) act on vector spaces. Examples of noncommutative rings are given by rings of square matrices or more generally by rings of endomorphisms of abelian groups or modules, and by monoid rings.

=== Representation theory ===
Representation theory is a branch of mathematics that draws heavily on non-commutative rings. It studies abstract algebraic structures by representing their elements as linear transformations of vector spaces, and studies modules over these abstract algebraic structures. In essence, a representation makes an abstract algebraic object more concrete by describing its elements by matrices and the algebraic operations in terms of matrix addition and matrix multiplication, which is non-commutative. The algebraic objects amenable to such a description include groups, associative algebras and Lie algebras. The most prominent of these (and historically the first) is the representation theory of groups, in which elements of a group are represented by invertible matrices in such a way that the group operation is matrix multiplication.

== Some relevant theorems ==
General

- Isomorphism theorems for rings
- Nakayama's lemma

Structure theorems

- The Artin–Wedderburn theorem determines the structure of semisimple rings
- The Jacobson density theorem determines the structure of primitive rings
- Goldie's theorem determines the structure of semiprime Goldie rings
- The Zariski–Samuel theorem determines the structure of a commutative principal ideal ring
- The Hopkins–Levitzki theorem gives necessary and sufficient conditions for a Noetherian ring to be an Artinian ring
- Morita theory consists of theorems determining when two rings have "equivalent" module categories
- Cartan–Brauer–Hua theorem gives insight on the structure of division rings
- Wedderburn's little theorem states that finite domains are fields

Other

- The Skolem–Noether theorem characterizes the automorphisms of simple rings

== Structures and invariants of rings ==
=== Dimension of a commutative ring ===
In this section, R denotes a commutative ring. The Krull dimension of R is the supremum of the lengths n of all the chains of prime ideals $\mathfrak{p}_0 \subsetneq \mathfrak{p}_1 \subsetneq \cdots \subsetneq \mathfrak{p}_n$. It turns out that the polynomial ring $k[t_1, \cdots, t_n]$ over a field k has dimension n. The fundamental theorem of dimension theory states that the following numbers coincide for a noetherian local ring $(R, \mathfrak{m})$:

- The Krull dimension of R.
- The minimum number of the generators of the $\mathfrak{m}$-primary ideals.
- The dimension of the graded ring $\textstyle \operatorname{gr}_{\mathfrak{m}}(R) = \bigoplus_{k \ge 0} \mathfrak{m}^k/{\mathfrak{m}^{k+1}}$ (equivalently, 1 plus the degree of its Hilbert polynomial).

A commutative ring R is said to be catenary if for every pair of prime ideals $\mathfrak{p} \subset \mathfrak{p}'$, there exists a finite chain of prime ideals $\mathfrak{p} = \mathfrak{p}_0 \subsetneq \cdots \subsetneq \mathfrak{p}_n = \mathfrak{p}'$ that is maximal in the sense that it is impossible to insert an additional prime ideal between two ideals in the chain, and all such maximal chains between $\mathfrak{p}$ and $\mathfrak{p}'$ have the same length. Practically all noetherian rings that appear in applications are catenary. Ratliff proved that a noetherian local integral domain R is catenary if and only if for every prime ideal $\mathfrak{p}$,

$$\operatorname{dim}R = \operatorname{ht}\mathfrak{p} + \operatorname{dim}R/\mathfrak{p}$$

where $\operatorname{ht}\mathfrak{p}$ is the height of $\mathfrak{p}$.

If R is an integral domain that is a finitely generated k-algebra, then its dimension is the transcendence degree of its field of fractions over k. If S is an integral extension of a commutative ring R, then S and R have the same dimension.

Closely related concepts are those of depth and global dimension. In general, if R is a noetherian local ring, then the depth of R is less than or equal to the dimension of R. When the equality holds, R is called a Cohen–Macaulay ring. A regular local ring is an example of a Cohen–Macaulay ring. It is a theorem of Serre that R is a regular local ring if and only if it has finite global dimension and in that case the global dimension is the Krull dimension of R. The significance of this is that a global dimension is a homological notion.

=== Morita equivalence ===
Two rings R, S are said to be Morita equivalent if the category of left modules over R is equivalent to the category of left modules over S. In fact, two commutative rings which are Morita equivalent must be isomorphic, so the notion does not add anything new to the category of commutative rings. However, commutative rings can be Morita equivalent to noncommutative rings, so Morita equivalence is coarser than isomorphism. Morita equivalence is especially important in algebraic topology and functional analysis.

=== Finitely generated projective module over a ring and Picard group ===
Let R be a commutative ring and $\mathbf{P}(R)$ the set of isomorphism classes of finitely generated projective modules over R; let also $\mathbf{P}_n(R)$ subsets consisting of those with constant rank n. (The rank of a module M is the continuous function $\operatorname{Spec}R \to \mathbb{Z}, \, \mathfrak{p} \mapsto \dim M \otimes_R k(\mathfrak{p})$.) $\mathbf{P}_1(R)$ is usually denoted by Pic(R). It is an abelian group called the Picard group of R. If R is an integral domain with the field of fractions F of R, then there is an exact sequence of groups:

$$1 \to R^* \to F^* \overset{f \mapsto fR}\to \operatorname{Cart}(R) \to \operatorname{Pic}(R) \to 1$$

where $\operatorname{Cart}(R)$ is the set of fractional ideals of R. If R is a regular domain (i.e., regular at any prime ideal), then Pic(R) is precisely the divisor class group of R.

For example, if R is a principal ideal domain, then Pic(R) vanishes. In algebraic number theory, R will be taken to be the ring of integers, which is Dedekind and thus regular. It follows that Pic(R) is a finite group (finiteness of class number) that measures the deviation of the ring of integers from being a PID.

One can also consider the group completion of $\mathbf{P}(R)$; this results in a commutative ring K_{0}(R). Note that K_{0}(R) = K_{0}(S) if two commutative rings R, S are Morita equivalent.

=== Structure of noncommutative rings ===
The structure of a noncommutative ring is more complicated than that of a commutative ring. For example, there exist simple rings that contain no non-trivial proper (two-sided) ideals, yet contain non-trivial proper left or right ideals. Various invariants exist for commutative rings, whereas invariants of noncommutative rings are difficult to find. As an example, the nilradical of a ring, the set of all nilpotent elements, is not necessarily an ideal unless the ring is commutative. Specifically, the set of all nilpotent elements in the ring of all n × n matrices over a division ring never forms an ideal, irrespective of the division ring chosen. There are, however, analogues of the nilradical defined for noncommutative rings, that coincide with the nilradical when commutativity is assumed.

The concept of the Jacobson radical of a ring; that is, the intersection of all right (left) annihilators of simple right (left) modules over a ring, is one example. The fact that the Jacobson radical can be viewed as the intersection of all maximal right (left) ideals in the ring, shows how the internal structure of the ring is reflected by its modules. It is also a fact that the intersection of all maximal right ideals in a ring is the same as the intersection of all maximal left ideals in the ring, in the context of all rings; irrespective of whether the ring is commutative.

Noncommutative rings are an active area of research due to their ubiquity in mathematics. For instance, the ring of n-by-n matrices over a field is noncommutative despite its natural occurrence in geometry, physics and many parts of mathematics. More generally, endomorphism rings of abelian groups are rarely commutative, the simplest example being the endomorphism ring of the Klein four-group.

One of the best-known strictly noncommutative ring is the quaternions.

== Applications ==
=== The coordinate ring of an algebraic variety ===
If X is an affine algebraic variety, then the set of all regular functions on X forms a ring called the coordinate ring of X. For a projective variety, there is an analogous ring called the homogeneous coordinate ring. Those rings are essentially the same things as varieties: they correspond in essentially a unique way. This may be seen via either Hilbert's Nullstellensatz or scheme-theoretic constructions (i.e., Spec and Proj).

=== Ring of invariants ===
A basic (and perhaps the most fundamental) question in the classical invariant theory is to find and study polynomials in the polynomial ring $k[V]$ that are invariant under the action of a finite group (or more generally reductive) G on V. The main example is the ring of symmetric polynomials: symmetric polynomials are polynomials that are invariant under permutation of variable. The fundamental theorem of symmetric polynomials states that this ring is $R[\sigma_1, \ldots, \sigma_n]$ where $\sigma_i$ are elementary symmetric polynomials.

== History ==
Commutative ring theory originated in algebraic number theory, algebraic geometry, and invariant theory. Central to the development of these subjects were the rings of integers in algebraic number fields and algebraic function fields, and the rings of polynomials in two or more variables. Noncommutative ring theory began with attempts to extend the complex numbers to various hypercomplex number systems. The genesis of the theories of commutative and noncommutative rings dates back to the early 19th century, while their maturity was achieved only in the third decade of the 20th century.

More precisely, William Rowan Hamilton put forth the quaternions and biquaternions; James Cockle presented tessarines and coquaternions; and William Kingdon Clifford was an enthusiast of split-biquaternions, which he called algebraic motors. These noncommutative algebras, and the non-associative Lie algebras, were studied within universal algebra before the subject was divided into particular mathematical structure types. One sign of re-organization was the use of direct sums to describe algebraic structure.

The various hypercomplex numbers were identified with matrix rings by Joseph Wedderburn (1908) and Emil Artin (1928). Wedderburn's structure theorems were formulated for finite-dimensional algebras over a field while Artin generalized them to Artinian rings.

In 1920, Emmy Noether, in collaboration with W. Schmeidler, published a paper about the theory of ideals in which they defined left and right ideals in a ring. The following year she published a landmark paper called Idealtheorie in Ringbereichen, analyzing ascending chain conditions with regard to (mathematical) ideals. Noted algebraist Irving Kaplansky called this work "revolutionary"; the publication gave rise to the term "Noetherian ring", and several other mathematical objects being called Noetherian.
