= Noncommutative ring =

Algebraic structure

In mathematics, a noncommutative ring is a ring whose multiplication is not commutative; that is, there exist a and b in the ring such that ab and ba are different. Equivalently, a noncommutative ring is a ring that is not a commutative ring.

Noncommutative algebra is the part of ring theory devoted to study of properties of the noncommutative rings, including the properties that apply also to commutative rings.

Sometimes the term noncommutative ring is used instead of ring to refer to an unspecified ring which is not necessarily commutative, and hence may be commutative. Generally, this is for emphasizing that the studied properties are not restricted to commutative rings, as, in many contexts, ring is used as a shorthand for commutative ring.

Although some authors do not assume that rings have a multiplicative identity, in this article we make that assumption unless stated otherwise.

== Examples ==
Some examples of noncommutative rings:

- The matrix ring of n-by-n matrices over the real numbers, where n > 1
- Hamilton's quaternions
- Any group ring constructed from a group that is not abelian

Some examples of rings that are not typically commutative (but may be commutative in simple cases):

- The free ring $\mathbb{Z}\langle x_1,\ldots,x_n\rangle$ generated by a finite set, an example of two non-equal elements being $2x_1x_2 + x_2x_1 \neq 3 x_1x_2$
- The Weyl algebra $A_n(\mathbb{C})$, being the ring of polynomial differential operators defined over affine space; for example, $A_1(\mathbb{C}) \cong \mathbb{C} \langle x, y \rangle / (xy - yx - 1)$, where the ideal corresponds to the commutator
- The quotient ring $\mathbb{C}\langle x_1,\ldots,x_n\rangle / (x_ix_j - q_{ij} x_jx_i)$, called a quantum plane, where $q_{ij} \in \mathbb{C}$
- Any Clifford algebra can be described explicitly using an algebra presentation: given an $\mathbb{F}$-vector space $V$ of dimension n with a quadratic form $q: V\otimes V \to \mathbb{F}$, the associated Clifford algebra has the presentation $\mathbb{F}\langle e_1,\ldots, e_n \rangle /(e_ie_j + e_je_i - q(e_i,e_j))$ for any basis $e_1,\ldots,e_n$ of $V$,
- Superalgebras are another example of noncommutative rings; they can be presented as $\mathbb{C}[x_1,\ldots,x_n]\langle \theta_1,\ldots, \theta_m \rangle / (\theta_i\theta_j + \theta_j\theta_i)$
- There are finite noncommutative rings: for example, the n-by-n matrices over a finite field, for n > 1. The smallest noncommutative ring is the ring of the upper triangular matrices over the field with two elements; it has eight elements and all noncommutative rings with eight elements are isomorphic to it or to its opposite.

== History ==
Beginning with division rings arising from geometry, the study of noncommutative rings has grown into a major area of modern algebra. The theory and exposition of noncommutative rings was expanded and refined in the 19th and 20th centuries by numerous authors. An incomplete list of such contributors includes E. Artin, Richard Brauer, P. M. Cohn, W. R. Hamilton, I. N. Herstein, N. Jacobson, K. Morita, E. Noether, Ø. Ore, J. Wedderburn and others.

== Differences between commutative and noncommutative algebra ==
Because noncommutative rings of scientific interest are more complicated than commutative rings, their structure, properties and behavior are less well understood. A great deal of work has been done successfully generalizing some results from commutative rings to noncommutative rings. A major difference between rings which are and are not commutative is the necessity to separately consider right ideals and left ideals. It is common for noncommutative ring theorists to enforce a condition on one of these types of ideals while not requiring it to hold for the opposite side. For commutative rings, the left–right distinction does not exist.

== Important classes ==
=== Division rings ===
A division ring, also called a skew field, is a ring in which division is possible. Specifically, it is a nonzero ring in which every nonzero element a has a multiplicative inverse, i.e., an element x with a · x = x · a = 1. Stated differently, a ring is a division ring if and only if its group of units is the set of all nonzero elements.

Division rings differ from fields only in that their multiplication is not required to be commutative. However, by Wedderburn's little theorem all finite division rings are commutative and therefore finite fields. Historically, division rings were sometimes referred to as fields, while fields were called "commutative fields".

=== Semisimple rings ===
A module over a (not necessarily commutative) ring with unity is said to be semisimple (or completely reducible) if it is the direct sum of simple (irreducible) submodules.

A ring is said to be (left)-semisimple if it is semisimple as a left module over itself. Surprisingly, a left-semisimple ring is also right-semisimple and vice versa. The left/right distinction is therefore unnecessary.

=== Semiprimitive rings ===
A semiprimitive ring or Jacobson semisimple ring or J-semisimple ring is a ring whose Jacobson radical is zero. This is a type of ring more general than a semisimple ring, but where simple modules still provide enough information about the ring. Rings such as the ring of integers are semiprimitive, and an artinian semiprimitive ring is just a semisimple ring. Semiprimitive rings can be understood as subdirect products of primitive rings, which are described by the Jacobson density theorem.

=== Simple rings ===
A simple ring is a non-zero ring that has no two-sided ideal besides the zero ideal and itself. A simple ring can always be considered as a simple algebra. Rings which are simple as rings but not as modules do exist: the full matrix ring over a field does not have any nontrivial ideals (since any ideal of M(n,R) is of the form M(n,I) with I an ideal of R), but has nontrivial left ideals (namely, the sets of matrices which have some fixed zero columns).

According to the Artin–Wedderburn theorem, every simple ring that is left or right Artinian is a matrix ring over a division ring. In particular, the only simple rings that are a finite-dimensional vector space over the real numbers are rings of matrices over either the real numbers, the complex numbers, or the quaternions.

Any quotient of a ring by a maximal ideal is a simple ring. In particular, a field is a simple ring. A ring R is simple if and only if its opposite ring R^{o} is simple.

An example of a simple ring that is not a matrix ring over a division ring is the Weyl algebra.

== Important theorems ==
=== Wedderburn's little theorem ===
Wedderburn's little theorem states that every finite domain is a field. In other words, for finite rings, there is no distinction between domains, division rings and fields.

The Artin–Zorn theorem generalizes the theorem to alternative rings: every finite simple alternative ring is a field.

=== Artin–Wedderburn theorem ===
The Artin–Wedderburn theorem is a classification theorem for semisimple rings and semisimple algebras. The theorem states that an (Artinian) semisimple ring R is isomorphic to a product of finitely many n_{i}-by-n_{i} matrix rings over division rings D_{i}, for some integers n_{i}, both of which are uniquely determined up to permutation of the index i. In particular, any simple left or right Artinian ring is isomorphic to an n-by-n matrix ring over a division ring D, where both n and D are uniquely determined.

As a direct corollary, the Artin–Wedderburn theorem implies that every simple ring that is finite-dimensional over a division ring (a simple algebra) is a matrix ring. This is Joseph Wedderburn's original result. Emil Artin later generalized it to the case of Artinian rings.

=== Jacobson density theorem ===
The Jacobson density theorem is a theorem concerning simple modules over a ring R.

The theorem can be applied to show that any primitive ring can be viewed as a "dense" subring of the ring of linear transformations of a vector space. This theorem first appeared in the literature in 1945, in the famous paper "Structure Theory of Simple Rings Without Finiteness Assumptions" by Nathan Jacobson. This can be viewed as a kind of generalization of the Artin-Wedderburn theorem's conclusion about the structure of simple Artinian rings.

More formally, the theorem can be stated as follows:

The Jacobson Density Theorem. Let U be a simple right R-module, D = End(U_{R}), and X ⊂ U a finite and D-linearly independent set. If A is a D-linear transformation on U then there exists r ∈ R such that A(x) = x · r for all x in X.

=== Nakayama's lemma ===
Let J(R) be the Jacobson radical of R. If U is a right module over a ring, R, and I is a right ideal in R, then define U·I to be the set of all (finite) sums of elements of the form u·i, where · is simply the action of R on U. Necessarily, U·I is a submodule of U.

If V is a maximal submodule of U, then U/V is simple. So U·J(R) is necessarily a subset of V, by the definition of J(R) and the fact that U/V is simple. Thus, if U contains at least one (proper) maximal submodule, U·J(R) is a proper submodule of U. However, this need not hold for arbitrary modules U over R, for U need not contain any maximal submodules. Naturally, if U is a Noetherian module, this holds. If R is Noetherian, and U is finitely generated, then U is a Noetherian module over R, and the conclusion is satisfied. Somewhat remarkable is that the weaker assumption, namely that U is finitely generated as an R-module (and no finiteness assumption on R), is sufficient to guarantee the conclusion. This is essentially the statement of Nakayama's lemma.

Precisely, one has the following.

Nakayama's lemma: Let U be a finitely generated right module over a ring R. If U is a non-zero module, then U·J(R) is a proper submodule of U.

A version of the lemma holds for right modules over non-commutative unitary rings R. The resulting theorem is sometimes known as the Jacobson–Azumaya theorem.

=== Noncommutative localization ===
Localization is a systematic method of adding multiplicative inverses to a ring, and is usually applied to commutative rings. Given a ring R and a subset S, one wants to construct some ring R* and ring homomorphism from R to R*, such that the image of S consists of units (invertible elements) in R*. Further one wants R* to be the 'best possible' or 'most general' way to do this – in the usual fashion this should be expressed by a universal property. The localization of R by S is usually denoted by S^{−1}R; however other notations are used in some important special cases. If S is the set of the non zero elements of an integral domain, then the localization is the field of fractions and thus usually denoted Frac(R).

Localizing non-commutative rings is more difficult; the localization does not exist for every set S of prospective units. One condition which ensures that the localization exists is the Ore condition.

One case for non-commutative rings where localization has a clear interest is for rings of differential operators. It has the interpretation, for example, of adjoining a formal inverse D^{−1} for a differentiation operator D. This is done in many contexts in methods for differential equations. There is now a large mathematical theory about it, named microlocalization, connecting with numerous other branches. The micro- tag is to do with connections with Fourier theory, in particular.

=== Morita equivalence ===
Morita equivalence is a relationship defined between rings that preserves many ring-theoretic properties. It is named after Japanese mathematician Kiiti Morita who defined equivalence and a similar notion of duality in 1958.

Two rings R and S (associative, with 1) are said to be (Morita) equivalent if there is an equivalence of the category of (left) modules over R, R-Mod, and the category of (left) modules over S, S-Mod. It can be shown that the left module categories R-Mod and S-Mod are equivalent if and only if the right module categories Mod-R and Mod-S are equivalent. Further it can be shown that any functor from R-Mod to S-Mod that yields an equivalence is automatically additive.

=== Brauer group ===
The Brauer group of a field K is an abelian group whose elements are Morita equivalence classes of central simple algebras of finite rank over K and addition is induced by the tensor product of algebras. It arose out of attempts to classify division algebras over a field and is named after the algebraist Richard Brauer. The group may also be defined in terms of Galois cohomology. More generally, the Brauer group of a scheme is defined in terms of Azumaya algebras.

=== Ore conditions ===
The Ore condition is a condition introduced by Øystein Ore, in connection with the question of extending beyond commutative rings the construction of a field of fractions, or more generally localization of a ring. The right Ore condition for a multiplicative subset S of a ring R is that for a ∈ R and s ∈ S, the intersection aS ∩ sR ≠ ∅. A domain that satisfies the right Ore condition is called a right Ore domain. The left case is defined similarly.

=== Goldie's theorem ===
In mathematics, Goldie's theorem is a basic structural result in ring theory, proved by Alfred Goldie during the 1950s. What is now termed a right Goldie ring is a ring R that has finite uniform dimension (also called "finite rank") as a right module over itself, and satisfies the ascending chain condition on right annihilators of subsets of R.

Goldie's theorem states that the semiprime right Goldie rings are precisely those that have a semisimple Artinian right classical ring of quotients. The structure of this ring of quotients is then completely determined by the Artin–Wedderburn theorem.

In particular, Goldie's theorem applies to semiprime right Noetherian rings, since by definition right Noetherian rings have the ascending chain condition on all right ideals. This is sufficient to guarantee that a right-Noetherian ring is right Goldie. The converse does not hold: every right Ore domain is a right Goldie domain, and hence so is every commutative integral domain.

A consequence of Goldie's theorem, again due to Goldie, is that every semiprime principal right ideal ring is isomorphic to a finite direct sum of prime principal right ideal rings. Every prime principal right ideal ring is isomorphic to a matrix ring over a right Ore domain.

== See also ==
- Anticommutative property
- Derived algebraic geometry
- Noncommutative geometry
- Noncommutative algebraic geometry
- Noncommutative harmonic analysis
- Representation theory (group theory)
