= Ring (mathematics) =

Algebraic structure with addition and multiplication

In mathematics, a ring is an algebraic structure consisting of a set with two binary operations typically called addition and multiplication and denoted like addition and multiplication of integers. They work similarly to integer addition and multiplication, except that multiplication in a ring does not need to be commutative. Ring elements may be numbers such as integers or complex numbers, but they may also be non-numerical objects such as polynomials, square matrices, functions, and power series.

More formally, a ring is a set that is endowed with two operations, called addition and multiplication, such that the ring is an abelian group with respect to addition. The multiplication is associative, is distributive over the addition, and has a multiplicative identity. Some authors omit the requirement for a multiplicative identity in the definition of a ring, and call ring with identity the above defined structure; see below § Variations in terminology for details.

A commutative ring is a ring with a commutative multiplication. This property has profound implications on ring properties. Commutative algebra, the theory of commutative rings, is a major branch of ring theory. Its development has been greatly influenced by problems and ideas of algebraic number theory and algebraic geometry. In turn, commutative algebra is a fundamental tool in these branches of mathematics.

Examples of commutative rings include every field (such as the real or complex numbers), the integers, the polynomials in one or several variables with coefficients in another ring, the coordinate ring of an affine algebraic variety, and the ring of integers of a number field. Examples of noncommutative rings include the ring of n × n real square matrices with n ≥ 2, group rings in representation theory, operator algebras in functional analysis, rings of differential operators, and cohomology rings in topology.

The conceptualization of rings spanned the 1870s to the 1920s, with key contributions by Richard Dedekind, David Hilbert, Abraham Fraenkel, and Emmy Noether. Rings were first formalized as a generalization of Dedekind domains that occur in number theory, and of polynomial rings and rings of invariants that occur in algebraic geometry and invariant theory. They later proved useful in other branches of mathematics such as geometry and analysis.

Rings appear in the following chain of class inclusions:

rngs ⊃ rings ⊃ commutative rings ⊃ integral domains ⊃ integrally closed domains ⊃ GCD domains ⊃ unique factorization domains ⊃ principal ideal domains ⊃ Euclidean domains ⊃ fields ⊃ algebraically closed fields

== Definition ==
A ring is a set R equipped with two binary operations (Note: This means that each operation is defined and produces a unique result in R for each ordered pair of elements of R.) + (addition) and ⋅ (multiplication) satisfying the following three sets of axioms, called the ring axioms:

1. R is an abelian group under addition, meaning that:
  - (a + b) + c = a + (b + c) for all a, b, c in R (that is, + is associative).
  - a + b = b + a for all a, b in R (that is, + is commutative).
  - There is an element 0 in R such that a + 0 = a for all a in R (that is, 0 is an additive identity).
  - For each a in R there exists −a in R such that a + (−a) = 0 (that is, −a is the additive inverse of a).
2. R is a monoid under multiplication, meaning that:
  - (a · b) · c = a · (b · c) for all a, b, c in R (that is, ⋅ is associative).
  - There is an element 1 in R such that a · 1 = a and 1 · a = a for all a in R (that is, 1 is a multiplicative identity). (Note: The existence of 1 is not assumed by some authors; here, the term rng is used if existence of a multiplicative identity is not assumed. See next subsection.)
3. Multiplication is distributive with respect to addition, meaning that:
  - a · (b + c) = (a · b) + (a · c) for all a, b, c in R (left distributivity).
  - (b + c) · a = (b · a) + (c · a) for all a, b, c in R (right distributivity).

In notation, the multiplication symbol · is often omitted, in which case a · b is written as ab.

=== Variations in terminology ===
In the terminology of this article, a ring is defined to have a multiplicative identity, while a structure with the same axiomatic definition but without the requirement for a multiplicative identity is instead called a ring without identity or "rng" (IPA: /rʊŋ/). (Note: The missing i refers to "without identity".) with a missing "i". For example, the set of even integers with the usual + and ⋅ is a rng, but not a ring. As explained in § History below, many authors use the term "ring" without requiring a multiplicative identity.

Although ring addition is commutative, ring multiplication is not required to be commutative: ab need not necessarily equal ba. Rings that also satisfy commutativity for multiplication (such as the ring of integers) are called commutative rings. Books on commutative algebra or algebraic geometry often adopt the convention that ring means commutative ring, to simplify terminology.

In a ring, multiplicative inverses are not required to exist. A nonzero ring in which every nonzero element has a multiplicative inverse is called a division ring and a commutative division ring is called a field.

The additive group of a ring is the underlying set equipped with only the operation of addition. Although the definition requires that the additive group be abelian, this can be inferred from the other ring axioms. The proof makes use of the "1", and does not work in a rng. (For a rng, omitting the axiom of commutativity of addition leaves it inferable from the remaining rng assumptions only for elements that are products: ab + cd = cd + ab.)

Some authors use the term "ring" to refer to structures in which there is no requirement for multiplication to be associative; see the nonassociative ring subsection below. For these authors, every algebra is a "ring".

== Illustration ==
The integers, along with the two operations of addition and multiplication, form the prototypical example of a ring.

The most familiar example of a ring is the set of all integers $\Z,$ consisting of the numbers

$$\dots,-5,-4,-3,-2,-1,0,1,2,3,4,5,\dots$$

The axioms of a ring are modeled on familiar properties of addition and multiplication of integers.

=== Some properties ===
Some basic properties of a ring follow immediately from the axioms:

- The additive identity is unique.
- The additive inverse of each element is unique.
- The multiplicative identity is unique.
- For any element x in a ring R, one has x0 = 0 = 0x (zero is an absorbing element with respect to multiplication) and (–1)x = –x.
- If 0 = 1 in a ring R (or more generally, 0 is a unit element), then R has only one element, and is called the zero ring.
- If a ring R contains the zero ring as a subring, then R itself is the zero ring.
- The binomial formula holds for any x and y satisfying xy = yx.

=== Example: Integers modulo 4 ===
Equip the set $\Z /4\Z = \left\{\overline{0}, \overline{1}, \overline{2}, \overline{3}\right\}$ with the following operations:

- The sum $\overline{x} + \overline{y}$ in $\Z/4\Z$ is the remainder when the integer x + y is divided by 4 (as x + y is always smaller than 8, this remainder is either x + y or x + y − 4). For example, $\overline{2} + \overline{3} = \overline{1}$ and $\overline{3} + \overline{3} = \overline{2}.$
- The product $\overline{x} \cdot \overline{y}$ in $\Z/4\Z$ is the remainder when the integer xy is divided by 4. For example, $\overline{2} \cdot \overline{3} = \overline{2}$ and $\overline{3} \cdot \overline{3} = \overline{1}.$

Then $\Z/4\Z$ is a ring: each axiom follows from the corresponding axiom for $\Z.$ If x is an integer, the remainder of x when divided by 4 may be considered as an element of $\Z/4\Z,$ and this element is often denoted by "x mod 4" or $\overline x,$ which is consistent with the notation for 0, 1, 2, 3. The additive inverse of any $\overline x$ in $\Z/4\Z$ is $-\overline x=\overline{-x}.$ For example, $-\overline{3} = \overline{-3} = \overline{1}.$

=== Example: 2-by-2 matrices ===
The set of 2-by-2 square matrices with entries in a field F is

$$\operatorname{M}_2(F) = \left\{ \left.\begin{pmatrix} a & b \\ c & d \end{pmatrix} \right|\  a, b, c, d \in F \right\}.$$

With the operations of matrix addition and matrix multiplication, $\operatorname{M}_2(F)$ satisfies the above ring axioms. The element $\left( \begin{smallmatrix} 1 & 0 \\ 0 & 1 \end{smallmatrix}\right)$ is the multiplicative identity of the ring. If $A = \left( \begin{smallmatrix} 0 & 1 \\ 1 & 0 \end{smallmatrix} \right)$ and $B = \left( \begin{smallmatrix} 0 & 1 \\ 0 & 0 \end{smallmatrix} \right),$ then $AB = \left( \begin{smallmatrix} 0 & 0 \\ 0 & 1 \end{smallmatrix} \right)$ while $BA = \left( \begin{smallmatrix} 1 & 0 \\ 0 & 0 \end{smallmatrix} \right);$ this example shows that the ring is noncommutative.

More generally, for any ring R, commutative or not, and any nonnegative integer n, the square n × n matrices with entries in R form a ring; see Matrix ring.

== History ==
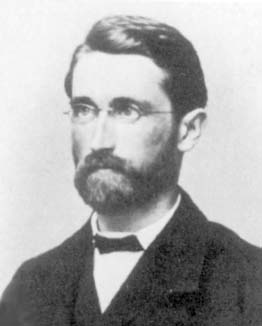
Richard Dedekind, one of the founders of ring theory

=== Dedekind ===
The study of rings originated from the theory of polynomial rings and the theory of algebraic integers. In 1871, Richard Dedekind defined the concept of the ring of integers of a number field. In this context, he introduced the terms "ideal" (inspired by Ernst Kummer's notion of ideal number) and "module" and studied their properties. Dedekind did not use the term "ring" and did not define the concept of a ring in a general setting.

=== Hilbert ===
The term "Zahlring" (number ring) was coined by David Hilbert in 1892 and published in 1897. According to Harvey Cohn, Hilbert used the term for a ring that had the property of "circling directly back" to an element of itself (in the sense of an equivalence). Specifically, in a ring of algebraic integers, all high powers of an algebraic integer can be written as an integral combination of a fixed set of lower powers, and thus the powers "cycle back". For instance, if a^{3} − 4a + 1 = 0 then:

$$\begin{align}
a^3 &= 4a-1, \\
a^4 &= 4a^2-a, \\
a^5 &= -a^2+16a-4, \\
a^6 &= 16a^2-8a+1, \\
a^7 &= -8a^2+65a-16, \\
\vdots \ & \qquad \vdots
\end{align}$$

and so on; in general, any power a^{n} can be written as an integral linear combination of 1, a, and a^{2}.

=== Fraenkel and Noether ===
The first axiomatic definition of a ring was given by Abraham Fraenkel in 1915, but his axioms were stricter than those in the modern definition. For instance, he required every non-zero-divisor to have a multiplicative inverse. In 1921, Emmy Noether gave a modern axiomatic definition of commutative rings (with and without 1) and developed the foundations of commutative ring theory in her paper Idealtheorie in Ringbereichen.

=== Multiplicative identity and the term "ring" ===
Fraenkel applied the term "ring" to structures with axioms that included a multiplicative identity, whereas Noether applied it to structures that did not.

Most or all books on algebra up to around 1960 followed Noether's convention of not requiring a 1 for a "ring". Starting in the 1960s, it became increasingly common to see books including the existence of 1 in the definition of "ring", especially in advanced books by notable authors such as Artin, Bourbaki, Eisenbud, and Lang. There are also books published as late as 2022 that use the term without the requirement for a 1. Likewise, the Encyclopedia of Mathematics does not require unit elements in rings. In a research article, the authors often specify which definition of ring they use in the beginning of that article.

Gardner and Wiegandt assert that, when dealing with several objects in the category of rings (as opposed to working with a fixed ring), if one requires all rings to have a 1, then some consequences include the lack of existence of infinite direct sums of rings, and that proper direct summands of rings are not subrings. They conclude that "in many, maybe most, branches of ring theory the requirement of the existence of a unity element is not sensible, and therefore unacceptable." Poonen makes the counterargument that the natural notion for rings would be the direct product rather than the direct sum. However, his main argument is that rings without a multiplicative identity are not totally associative, in the sense that they do not contain the product of any finite sequence of ring elements, including the empty sequence. (Note: Poonen claims that "the natural extension of associativity demands that rings should contain an empty product, so it is natural to require rings to have a 1".)

Authors who follow either convention for the use of the term "ring" may use one of the following terms to refer to objects satisfying the other convention:

- to include a requirement for a multiplicative identity: "unital ring", "unitary ring", "unit ring", "ring with unity", "ring with identity", "ring with a unit", or "ring with 1".
- to omit a requirement for a multiplicative identity: "rng" or "pseudo-ring", although the latter may be confusing because it also has other meanings.

== Basic examples ==
=== Commutative rings ===
- The prototypical example is the ring of integers with the two operations of addition and multiplication.
- The rational, real and complex numbers are commutative rings of a type called fields.
- A unital associative algebra over a commutative ring R is itself a ring as well as an R-module. Some examples:
  - The algebra R[X] of polynomials with coefficients in R.
  - The algebra $R[[X_1, \dots, X_n]]$ of formal power series with coefficients in R.
  - The set of all continuous real-valued functions defined on the real line forms a commutative $\R$-algebra. The operations are pointwise addition and multiplication of functions.
  - Let X be a set, and let R be a ring. Then the set of all functions from X to R forms a ring, which is commutative if R is commutative.
- The ring of quadratic integers, the integral closure of $\Z$ in a quadratic extension of $\Q.$ It is a subring of the ring of all algebraic integers.
- The ring of profinite integers $\widehat\Z,$ the (infinite) product of the rings of p-adic integers $\Z _p$ over all prime numbers p.
- The Hecke ring, the ring generated by Hecke operators.
- If S is a set, then the power set of S becomes a ring if we define addition to be the symmetric difference of sets and multiplication to be intersection. This is an example of a Boolean ring.

=== Noncommutative rings ===
- For any ring R and any natural number n, the set of all square n-by-n matrices with entries from R, forms a ring with matrix addition and matrix multiplication as operations. For n = 1, this matrix ring is isomorphic to R itself. For n > 1 (and R not the zero ring), this matrix ring is noncommutative.
- If G is an abelian group, then the endomorphisms of G form a ring, the endomorphism ring End(G) of G. The operations in this ring are addition and composition of endomorphisms. More generally, if V is a left module over a ring R, then the set of all R-linear maps forms a ring, also called the endomorphism ring and denoted by End_{R}(V).
- The endomorphism ring of an elliptic curve. It is a commutative ring if the elliptic curve is defined over a field of characteristic zero.
- If G is a group and R is a ring, the group ring of G over R is a free module over R having G as basis. Multiplication is defined by the rules that the elements of G commute with the elements of R and multiply together as they do in the group G.
- The ring of differential operators (depending on the context). In fact, many rings that appear in analysis are noncommutative. For example, most Banach algebras are noncommutative.

=== Non-rings ===
- The set of natural numbers $\N$ with the usual operations is not a ring, since $(\N, +)$ is not even a group (not all the elements are invertible with respect to addition – for instance, there is no natural number which can be added to 3 to get 0 as a result). There is a natural way to enlarge it to a ring, by including negative numbers to produce the ring of integers $\Z.$ The natural numbers (including 0) form an algebraic structure known as a semiring (which has all of the axioms of a ring excluding that of an additive inverse).
- Let R be the set of all continuous functions on the real line that vanish outside a bounded interval that depends on the function, with addition as usual but with multiplication defined as convolution:
  $$(f * g)(x) = \int_{-\infty}^\infty f(y)g(x - y) \, dy.$$
  Then R is a rng, but not a ring: the Dirac delta function has the property of a multiplicative identity, but it is not a function and hence is not an element of R.

== Basic concepts ==
=== Products and powers ===
For each nonnegative integer n, given a sequence $(a_1,\dots,a_n)$ of n elements of R, one can define the product $\textstyle P_n = \prod_{i=1}^n a_i$ recursively: let P_{0} = 1 and let P_{m} = P_{m−1}a_{m} for 1 ≤ m ≤ n.

As a special case, one can define nonnegative integer powers of an element a of a ring: a^{0} = 1 and a^{n} = a^{n−1}a for n ≥ 1. Then a^{m+n} = a^{m}a^{n} for all m, n ≥ 0.

=== Elements in a ring ===
A left zero divisor of a ring R is an element a in the ring such that there exists a nonzero element b of R such that ab = 0. (Note: Some other authors such as Lang further require a zero divisor to be nonzero.) A right zero divisor is defined similarly.

A nilpotent element is an element a such that a^{n} = 0 for some n > 0. One example of a nilpotent element is a nilpotent matrix. A nilpotent element in a nonzero ring is necessarily a zero divisor.

An idempotent $e$ is an element such that e^{2} = e. One example of an idempotent element is a projection in linear algebra.

A unit is an element a having a multiplicative inverse; in this case the inverse is unique, and is denoted by a^{–1}. The set of units of a ring is a group under ring multiplication; this group is denoted by R^{×} or R* or U(R). For example, if R is the ring of all square matrices of size n over a field, then R^{×} consists of the set of all invertible matrices of size n, and is called the general linear group.

=== Subring ===
A subset S of R is called a subring if any one of the following equivalent conditions holds:

- the addition and multiplication of R restrict to give operations S × S → S making S a ring with the same multiplicative identity as R.
- 1 ∈ S; and for all x, y in S, the elements xy, x + y, and −x are in S.
- S can be equipped with operations making it a ring such that the inclusion map S → R is a ring homomorphism.

For example, the ring $\Z$ of integers is a subring of the field of real numbers and also a subring of the ring of polynomials $\Z[X]$ (in both cases, $\Z$ contains 1, which is the multiplicative identity of the larger rings). On the other hand, the subset of even integers $2\Z$ does not contain the identity element 1 and thus does not qualify as a subring of $\Z;$ one could call $2\Z$ a subrng, however.

An intersection of subrings is a subring. Given a subset E of R, the smallest subring of R containing E is the intersection of all subrings of R containing E, and it is called the subring generated by E.

For a ring R, the smallest subring of R is called the characteristic subring of R. It can be generated through addition of copies of 1 and −1. It is possible that n · 1 = 1 + 1 + ... + 1 (n times) can be zero. If n is the smallest positive integer such that this occurs, then n is called the characteristic of R. In some rings, n · 1 is never zero for any positive integer n, and those rings are said to have characteristic zero.

Given a ring R, let Z(R) denote the set of all elements x in R such that x commutes with every element in R: xy = yx for any y in R. Then Z(R) is a subring of R, called the center of R. More generally, given a subset X of R, let S be the set of all elements in R that commute with every element in X. Then S is a subring of R, called the centralizer (or commutant) of X. The center is the centralizer of the entire ring R. Elements or subsets of the center are said to be central in R; they (each individually) generate a subring of the center.

=== Ideal ===
Let R be a ring. A left ideal of R is a nonempty subset I of R such that for any x, y in I and r in R, the elements x + y and rx are in I. Let RI denote the R-span of I, that is, the set of finite sums

$$r_1 x_1 + \cdots + r_n x_n \quad \textrm{such}\;\textrm{that}\; r_i \in R  \; \textrm{ and } \; x_i \in I;$$

then I is a left ideal if RI ⊆ I. Similarly, a right ideal is a subset I such that IR ⊆ I. A subset I is said to be a two-sided ideal or simply ideal if it is both a left ideal and right ideal. A one-sided or two-sided ideal is then an additive subgroup of R. If E is a subset of R, then RE is a left ideal, called the left ideal generated by E; it is the smallest left ideal containing E. Similarly, one can consider the right ideal or the two-sided ideal generated by a subset of R.

If x is in R, then Rx is a left ideal, and xR is a right ideal; they are called the principal left ideal and right ideal generated by x. The principal ideal RxR is written as (x). For example, the set of all positive and negative multiples of 2 along with 0 form an ideal of the integers, and this ideal is generated by the integer 2. In fact, every ideal of the ring of integers is principal.

A ring is simple if it is nonzero and it has no proper nonzero two-sided ideals. A commutative simple ring is precisely a field.

Rings are often studied with special conditions set upon their ideals. For example, a ring in which there is no strictly increasing infinite chain of left ideals is called a left Noetherian ring. A ring in which there is no strictly decreasing infinite chain of left ideals is called a left Artinian ring. It is a somewhat surprising fact that a left Artinian ring is left Noetherian (the Hopkins–Levitzki theorem). The integers, however, form a Noetherian ring which is not Artinian.

For commutative rings, the ideals generalize the classical notion of divisibility and decomposition of an integer into prime numbers in algebra. A proper ideal P of R is called a prime ideal if for any elements $x, y\in R$ we have that $xy \in P$ implies either $x \in P$ or $y\in P.$ Equivalently, P is prime if for any ideals I, J we have that IJ ⊆ P implies either I ⊆ P or J ⊆ P. This latter formulation illustrates the idea of ideals as generalizations of elements.

=== Homomorphism ===
A homomorphism from a ring (R, +, ⋅) to a ring (S, ‡, ∗) is a function f from R to S that preserves the ring operations; namely, such that, for all a, b in R the following identities hold:

$$\begin{align}
& f(a+b) = f(a) \ddagger f(b) \\
& f(a\cdot b) = f(a)*f(b) \\
& f(1_R) = 1_S
\end{align}$$

If one is working with rngs, then the third condition is dropped.

A ring homomorphism f is said to be an isomorphism if there exists an inverse homomorphism to f (that is, a ring homomorphism that is an inverse function), or equivalently if it is bijective.

Examples:

- The function that maps each integer x to its remainder modulo 4 (a number in {0, 1, 2, 3}) is a homomorphism from the ring $\Z$ to the quotient ring $\Z/4\Z$ ("quotient ring" is defined below).
- If u is a unit element in a ring R, then $R \to R, x \mapsto uxu^{-1}$ is a ring homomorphism, called an inner automorphism of R.
- Let R be a commutative ring of prime characteristic p. Then x ↦ x^{p} is a ring endomorphism of R called the Frobenius homomorphism.
- The Galois group of a field extension L / K is the set of all automorphisms of L whose restrictions to K are the identity.
- For any ring R, there is a unique ring homomorphism $\Z \to R$, and there is a unique ring homomorphism $R \to 0$.
- An algebra homomorphism from a k-algebra to the endomorphism algebra of a vector space over k is called a representation of the algebra.

Given a ring homomorphism f : R → S, the set of all elements mapped to 0 by f is called the kernel of f. The kernel is a two-sided ideal of R. The image of f, on the other hand, is not always an ideal, but it is always a subring of S.

To give a ring homomorphism from a commutative ring R to a ring A with image contained in the center of A is the same as to give a structure of an algebra over R to A (which in particular gives a structure of an A-module).

=== Quotient ring ===
The notion of quotient ring is analogous to the notion of a quotient group. Given a ring (R, +, ⋅) and a two-sided ideal I of (R, +, ⋅), view I as subgroup of (R, +); then the quotient ring R / I is the set of cosets of I together with the operations

$$\begin{align}
& (a+I)+(b+I) = (a+b)+I, \\
& (a+I)(b+I) = (ab)+I.
\end{align}$$

for all a, b in R. The ring R / I is also called a factor ring.

As with a quotient group, there is a canonical homomorphism p : R → R / I, given by x ↦ x + I. It is surjective and satisfies the following universal property:

- If f : R → S is a ring homomorphism such that f(I) = 0, then there is a unique homomorphism $\overline{f} : R/I \to S$ such that $f = \overline{f} \circ p.$

For any ring homomorphism f : R → S, invoking the universal property with I = ker f produces a homomorphism $\overline{f} : R / \ker f \to S$ that gives an isomorphism from R / ker f to the image of f.

== Modules ==
The concept of a module over a ring generalizes the concept of a vector space (over a field) by generalizing from multiplication of vectors with elements of a field (scalar multiplication) to multiplication with elements of a ring. More precisely, given a ring R, an R-module M is an abelian group equipped with an operation R × M → M (associating an element of M to every pair of an element of R and an element of M) that satisfies certain axioms. This operation is commonly denoted by juxtaposition and called multiplication. The axioms of modules are the following: for all a, b in R and all x, y in M,

M is an abelian group under addition.
$$\begin{align}
& a(x+y) = ax+ay \\
& (a+b)x = ax+bx \\
& 1x = x \\
& (ab)x = a(bx)
\end{align}$$

When the ring is noncommutative these axioms define left modules; right modules are defined similarly by writing xa instead of ax. This is not only a change of notation, as the last axiom of right modules (that is x(ab) = (xa)b) becomes (ab)x = b(ax), if left multiplication (by ring elements) is used for a right module.

Basic examples of modules are ideals, including the ring itself.

Although similarly defined, the theory of modules is much more complicated than that of vector space, mainly, because, unlike vector spaces, modules are not characterized (up to an isomorphism) by a single invariant (the dimension of a vector space). In particular, not all modules have a basis.

The axioms of modules imply that (−1)x = −x, where the first minus denotes the additive inverse in the ring and the second minus the additive inverse in the module. Using this and denoting repeated addition by a multiplication by a positive integer allows identifying abelian groups with modules over the ring of integers.

Any ring homomorphism induces a structure of a module: if f : R → S is a ring homomorphism, then S is a left module over R by the multiplication: rs = f(r)s. If R is commutative or if f(R) is contained in the center of S, the ring S is called a R-algebra. In particular, every ring is an algebra over the integers.

== Constructions ==
=== Direct product ===
Let R and S be rings. Then the product R × S can be equipped with the following natural ring structure:

$$\begin{align}
& (r_1,s_1) + (r_2,s_2) = (r_1+r_2,s_1+s_2) \\
& (r_1,s_1) \cdot (r_2,s_2)=(r_1\cdot r_2,s_1\cdot s_2)
\end{align}$$

for all r_{1}, r_{2} in R and s_{1}, s_{2} in S. The ring R × S with the above operations of addition and multiplication and the multiplicative identity (1, 1) is called the direct product of R with S. The same construction also works for an arbitrary family of rings: if R_{i} are rings indexed by a set I, then $\prod_{i \in I} R_i$ is a ring with componentwise addition and multiplication.

Let R be a commutative ring and $\mathfrak{a}_1, \cdots, \mathfrak{a}_n$ be ideals such that $\mathfrak{a}_i + \mathfrak{a}_j = (1)$ whenever i ≠ j. Then the Chinese remainder theorem says there is a canonical ring isomorphism:
$$R /{\textstyle \bigcap_{i=1}^{n}{\mathfrak{a}_i}} \simeq \prod_{i=1}^{n}{R/ \mathfrak{a}_i}, \qquad x \bmod {\textstyle \bigcap_{i=1}^{n}\mathfrak{a}_i} \mapsto (x \bmod \mathfrak{a}_1, \ldots , x \bmod \mathfrak{a}_n).$$

A "finite" direct product may also be viewed as a direct sum of ideals. Namely, let $R_i, 1 \le i \le n$ be rings, $R_i \to R = \prod R_i$ the inclusions with the images $\mathfrak{a}_i$ (in particular $\mathfrak{a}_i$ are rings though not subrings). Then $\mathfrak{a}_i$ are ideals of R and
$$R = \mathfrak{a}_1 \oplus \cdots \oplus \mathfrak{a}_n, \quad \mathfrak{a}_i \mathfrak{a}_j = 0, i \ne j, \quad \mathfrak{a}_i^2 \subseteq \mathfrak{a}_i$$
as a direct sum of abelian groups (because for abelian groups finite products are the same as direct sums). Clearly the direct sum of such ideals also defines a product of rings that is isomorphic to R. Equivalently, the above can be done through central idempotents. Assume that R has the above decomposition. Then we can write
$$1 = e_1 + \cdots + e_n, \quad e_i \in \mathfrak{a}_i.$$
By the conditions on $\mathfrak{a}_i,$ one has that e_{i} are central idempotents and e_{i}e_{j} = 0, i ≠ j (orthogonal). Again, one can reverse the construction. Namely, if one is given a partition of 1 in orthogonal central idempotents, then let $\mathfrak{a}_i = R e_i,$ which are two-sided ideals. If each e_{i} is not a sum of orthogonal central idempotents, (Note: Such a central idempotent is called centrally primitive.) then their direct sum is isomorphic to R.

An important application of an infinite direct product is the construction of a projective limit of rings (see below). Another application is a restricted product of a family of rings (cf. adele ring).

=== Polynomial ring ===
Given a symbol t (called a variable) and a commutative ring R, the set of polynomials

$$R[t] = \left\{ a_n t^n + a_{n-1} t^{n -1} + \dots + a_1 t + a_0  \mid n \ge 0, a_j \in R \right\}$$

forms a commutative ring with the usual addition and multiplication, containing R as a subring. It is called the polynomial ring over R. More generally, the set $R\left[t_1, \ldots, t_n\right]$ of all polynomials in variables $t_1, \ldots, t_n$ forms a commutative ring, containing $R\left[t_i\right]$ as subrings.

If R is an integral domain, then R[t] is also an integral domain; its field of fractions is the field of rational functions. If R is a Noetherian ring, then R[t] is a Noetherian ring. If R is a unique factorization domain, then R[t] is a unique factorization domain. Finally, R is a field if and only if R[t] is a principal ideal domain.

Let $R \subseteq S$ be commutative rings. Given an element x of S, one can consider the ring homomorphism

$$R[t] \to S, \quad f \mapsto f(x)$$

(that is, the substitution). If S = R[t] and x = t, then f(t) = f. Because of this, the polynomial f is often also denoted by f(t). The image of the map $f \mapsto f(x)$ is denoted by R[x]; it is the same thing as the subring of S generated by R and x.

Example: $k\left[t^2, t^3\right]$ denotes the image of the homomorphism

$$k[x, y] \to k[t], \, f \mapsto f\left(t^2, t^3\right).$$

In other words, it is the subalgebra of k[t] generated by t^{2} and t^{3}.

Example: let f be a polynomial in one variable, that is, an element in a polynomial ring R. Then f(x + h) is an element in R[h] and f(x + h) – f(x) is divisible by h in that ring. The result of substituting zero to h in (f(x + h) – f(x)) / h is f' (x), the derivative of f at x.

The substitution is a special case of the universal property of a polynomial ring. The property states: given a ring homomorphism $\phi: R \to S$ and an element x in S there exists a unique ring homomorphism $\overline{\phi}: R[t] \to S$ such that $\overline{\phi}(t) = x$ and $\overline{\phi}$ restricts to ϕ. For example, choosing a basis, a symmetric algebra satisfies the universal property and so is a polynomial ring.

To give an example, let S be the ring of all functions from R to itself; the addition and the multiplication are those of functions. Let x be the identity function. Each r in R defines a constant function, giving rise to the homomorphism R → S. The universal property says that this map extends uniquely to

$$R[t] \to S, \quad f \mapsto \overline{f}$$

(t maps to x) where $\overline{f}$ is the polynomial function defined by f. The resulting map is injective if and only if R is infinite.

Given a non-constant monic polynomial f in R[t], there exists a ring S containing R such that f is a product of linear factors in S[t].

Let k be an algebraically closed field. The Hilbert's Nullstellensatz (theorem of zeros) states that there is a natural one-to-one correspondence between the set of all prime ideals in $k\left[t_1, \ldots, t_n\right]$ and the set of closed subvarieties of k^{n}. In particular, many local problems in algebraic geometry may be attacked through the study of the generators of an ideal in a polynomial ring. (cf. Gröbner basis.)

There are some other related constructions. A formal power series ring $R[\![t]\!]$ consists of formal power series

$$\sum_0^\infty a_i t^i, \quad a_i \in R$$

together with multiplication and addition that mimic those for convergent series. It contains R[t] as a subring. A formal power series ring does not have the universal property of a polynomial ring; a series may not converge after a substitution. The important advantage of a formal power series ring over a polynomial ring is that it is local (in fact, complete).

=== Matrix ring and endomorphism ring ===
Let R be a ring (not necessarily commutative). The set of all square matrices of size n with entries in R forms a ring with the entry-wise addition and the usual matrix multiplication. It is called the matrix ring and is denoted by M_{n}(R). Given a right R-module U, the set of all R-linear maps from U to itself forms a ring with addition that is of function and multiplication that is of composition of functions; it is called the endomorphism ring of U and is denoted by End_{R}(U).

As in linear algebra, a matrix ring may be canonically interpreted as an endomorphism ring: $\operatorname{End}_R(R^n) \simeq \operatorname{M}_n(R).$ This is a special case of the following fact: If $f: \oplus_1^n U \to \oplus_1^n U$ is an R-linear map, then f may be written as a matrix with entries f_{ij} in S = End_{R}(U), resulting in the ring isomorphism:

$$\operatorname{End}_R(\oplus_1^n U) \to \operatorname{M}_n(S), \quad f \mapsto (f_{ij}).$$

Any ring homomorphism R → S induces M_{n}(R) → M_{n}(S).

Schur's lemma says that if U is a simple right R-module, then End_{R}(U) is a division ring. If $U = \bigoplus_{i = 1}^r U_i^{\oplus m_i}$ is a direct sum of m_{i}-copies of simple R-modules $U_i,$ then

$$\operatorname{End}_R(U) \simeq \prod_{i=1}^r \operatorname{M}_{m_i} (\operatorname{End}_R(U_i)).$$

The Artin–Wedderburn theorem states any semisimple ring (cf. below) is of this form.

A ring R and the matrix ring M_{n}(R) over it are Morita equivalent: the category of right modules of R is equivalent to the category of right modules over M_{n}(R). In particular, two-sided ideals in R correspond in one-to-one to two-sided ideals in M_{n}(R).

=== Limits and colimits of rings ===
Let R_{i} be a sequence of rings such that R_{i} is a subring of R_{i + 1} for all i. Then the union (or filtered colimit) of R_{i} is the ring $\varinjlim R_i$ defined as follows: it is the disjoint union of all R_{i}'s modulo the equivalence relation x ~ y if and only if x = y in R_{i} for sufficiently large i.

Examples of colimits:

- A polynomial ring in infinitely many variables: $R[t_1, t_2, \cdots] = \varinjlim R[t_1, t_2, \cdots, t_m].$
- The algebraic closure of finite fields of the same characteristic $\overline{\mathbf{F}}_p = \varinjlim \mathbf{F}_{p^m}.$
- The function field of an algebraic variety over a field k is $\varinjlim k[U]$ where the limit runs over all the coordinate rings k[U] of nonempty open subsets U (more succinctly it is the stalk of the structure sheaf at the generic point.)

Any ring is the filtered colimit (union) of its finitely generated subrings.

A projective limit (or a filtered limit) of rings is defined as follows. Suppose we are given a family of rings R_{i}, i running over positive integers, say, and ring homomorphisms R_{j} → R_{i}, j ≥ i such that R_{i} → R_{i} are all the identities and R_{k} → R_{j} → R_{i} is R_{k} → R_{i} whenever k ≥ j ≥ i. Then $\varprojlim R_i$ is the subring of $\textstyle \prod R_i$ consisting of (x_{n}) such that x_{j} maps to x_{i} under R_{j} → R_{i}, j ≥ i.

For an example of a projective limit, see § Completion.

=== Localization ===
The localization generalizes the construction of the field of fractions of an integral domain to an arbitrary ring and modules. Given a (not necessarily commutative) ring R and a subset S of R, there exists a ring $R[S^{-1}]$ together with the ring homomorphism $R \to R\left[S^{-1}\right]$ that "inverts" S; that is, the homomorphism maps elements in S to unit elements in $R\left[S^{-1}\right],$ and, moreover, any ring homomorphism from R that "inverts" S uniquely factors through $R\left[S^{-1}\right].$ The ring $R\left[S^{-1}\right]$ is called the localization of R with respect to S. For example, if R is a commutative ring and f an element in R, then the localization $R\left[f^{-1}\right]$ consists of elements of the form $r/f^n, \, r \in R , \, n \ge 0$ (to be precise, $R\left[f^{-1}\right] = R[t]/(tf - 1).$)

The localization is frequently applied to a commutative ring R with respect to the complement of a prime ideal (or a union of prime ideals) in R. In that case $S = R - \mathfrak{p},$ one often writes $R_\mathfrak{p}$ for $R\left[S^{-1}\right].$ $R_\mathfrak{p}$ is then a local ring with the maximal ideal $\mathfrak{p} R_\mathfrak{p}.$ This is the reason for the terminology "localization". The field of fractions of an integral domain R is the localization of R at the prime ideal zero. If $\mathfrak{p}$ is a prime ideal of a commutative ring R, then the field of fractions of $R/\mathfrak{p}$ is the same as the residue field of the local ring $R_\mathfrak{p}$ and is denoted by $k(\mathfrak{p}).$

If M is a left R-module, then the localization of M with respect to S is given by a change of rings $M\left[S^{-1}\right] = R\left[S^{-1}\right] \otimes_R M.$

The most important properties of localization are the following: when R is a commutative ring and S a multiplicatively closed subset

- $\mathfrak{p} \mapsto \mathfrak{p}\left[S^{-1}\right]$ is a bijection between the set of all prime ideals in R disjoint from S and the set of all prime ideals in $R\left[S^{-1}\right].$
- $R\left[S^{-1}\right] = \varinjlim R\left[f^{-1}\right],$ f running over elements in S with partial ordering given by divisibility.
- The localization is exact:
  $$0 \to M'\left[S^{-1}\right] \to M\left[S^{-1}\right] \to M''\left[S^{-1}\right] \to 0$$
  is exact over $R\left[S^{-1}\right]$ whenever $0 \to M' \to M \to M'' \to 0$ is exact over R.
- Conversely, if $0 \to M'_\mathfrak{m} \to M_\mathfrak{m} \to M''_\mathfrak{m} \to 0$ is exact for any maximal ideal $\mathfrak{m},$ then $0 \to M' \to M \to M'' \to 0$ is exact.
- A remark: localization is no help in proving a global existence. One instance of this is that if two modules are isomorphic at all prime ideals, it does not follow that they are isomorphic. (One way to explain this is that the localization allows one to view a module as a sheaf over prime ideals and a sheaf is inherently a local notion.)

In category theory, a localization of a category amounts to making some morphisms isomorphisms. An element in a commutative ring R may be thought of as an endomorphism of any R-module. Thus, categorically, a localization of R with respect to a subset S of R is a functor from the category of R-modules to itself that sends elements of S viewed as endomorphisms to automorphisms and is universal with respect to this property. (Of course, R then maps to $R\left[S^{-1}\right]$ and R-modules map to $R\left[S^{-1}\right]$-modules.)

=== Completion ===
Let R be a commutative ring, and let I be an ideal of R. The completion of R at I is the projective limit $\hat{R} = \varprojlim R/I^n;$ it is a commutative ring. The canonical homomorphisms from R to the quotients $R/I^n$ induce a homomorphism $R \to \hat{R}.$ The latter homomorphism is injective if R is a Noetherian integral domain and I is a proper ideal, or if R is a Noetherian local ring with maximal ideal I, by Krull's intersection theorem. The construction is especially useful when I is a maximal ideal.

The basic example is the completion of $\Z$ at the principal ideal (p) generated by a prime number p; it is called the ring of p-adic integers and is denoted $\Z_p.$ The completion can in this case be constructed also from the p-adic absolute value on $\Q.$ The p-adic absolute value on $\Q$ is a map $x \mapsto |x|$ from $\Q$ to $\R$ given by $|n|_p=p^{-v_p(n)}$ where $v_p(n)$ denotes the exponent of p in the prime factorization of a nonzero integer n into prime numbers (we also put $|0|_p=0$ and $|m/n|_p = |m|_p/|n|_p$). It defines a distance function on $\Q$ and the completion of $\Q$ as a metric space is denoted by $\Q_p.$ It is again a field since the field operations extend to the completion. The subring of $\Q_p$ consisting of elements x with |x|_{p} ≤ 1 is isomorphic to $\Z_p.$

Similarly, the formal power series ring R[{[t]}] is the completion of R[t] at (t) (see also Hensel's lemma)

A complete ring has much simpler structure than a commutative ring. This owns to the Cohen structure theorem, which says, roughly, that a complete local ring tends to look like a formal power series ring or a quotient of it. On the other hand, the interaction between the integral closure and completion has been among the most important aspects that distinguish modern commutative ring theory from the classical one developed by the likes of Noether. Pathological examples found by Nagata led to the reexamination of the roles of Noetherian rings and motivated, among other things, the definition of excellent ring.

=== Rings with generators and relations ===
The most general way to construct a ring is by specifying generators and relations. Let F be a free ring (that is, free algebra over the integers) with the set X of symbols, that is, F consists of polynomials with integral coefficients in noncommuting variables that are elements of X. A free ring satisfies the universal property: any function from the set X to a ring R factors through F so that F → R is the unique ring homomorphism. Just as in the group case, every ring can be represented as a quotient of a free ring.

Now, we can impose relations among symbols in X by taking a quotient. Explicitly, if E is a subset of F, then the quotient ring of F by the ideal generated by E is called the ring with generators X and relations E. If we used a ring, say, A as a base ring instead of $\Z,$ then the resulting ring will be over A. For example, if $E = \{ xy - yx \mid x, y \in X \},$ then the resulting ring will be the usual polynomial ring with coefficients in A in variables that are elements of X (It is also the same thing as the symmetric algebra over A with symbols X.)

In the category-theoretic terms, the formation $S \mapsto \text{the free ring generated by the set } S$ is the left adjoint functor of the forgetful functor from the category of rings to Set (and it is often called the free ring functor.)

Let A, B be algebras over a commutative ring R. Then the tensor product of R-modules $A \otimes_R B$ is an R-algebra with multiplication characterized by $(x \otimes u) (y \otimes v) = xy \otimes uv.$

== Special kinds of rings ==
=== Domains ===
A nonzero ring with no nonzero zero-divisors is called a domain. A commutative domain is called an integral domain. The most important integral domains are principal ideal domains, PIDs for short, and fields. A principal ideal domain is an integral domain in which every ideal is principal. An important class of integral domains that contain a PID is a unique factorization domain (UFD), an integral domain in which every nonunit element is a product of prime elements (an element is prime if it generates a prime ideal.) The fundamental question in algebraic number theory is on the extent to which the ring of (generalized) integers in a number field, where an "ideal" admits prime factorization, fails to be a PID.

Among theorems concerning a PID, the most important one is the structure theorem for finitely generated modules over a principal ideal domain. The theorem may be illustrated by the following application to linear algebra. Let V be a finite-dimensional vector space over a field k and f : V → V a linear map with minimal polynomial q. Then, since k[t] is a unique factorization domain, q factors into powers of distinct irreducible polynomials (that is, prime elements):
$$q = p_1^{e_1} \ldots p_s^{e_s}.$$

Letting $t \cdot v = f(v),$ we make V a k[t]-module. The structure theorem then says V is a direct sum of cyclic modules, each of which is isomorphic to the module of the form $k[t] / \left(p_i^{k_j}\right).$ Now, if $p_i(t) = t - \lambda_i,$ then such a cyclic module (for p_{i}) has a basis in which the restriction of f is represented by a Jordan matrix. Thus, if, say, k is algebraically closed, then all p_{i}'s are of the form t – λ_{i} and the above decomposition corresponds to the Jordan canonical form of f.

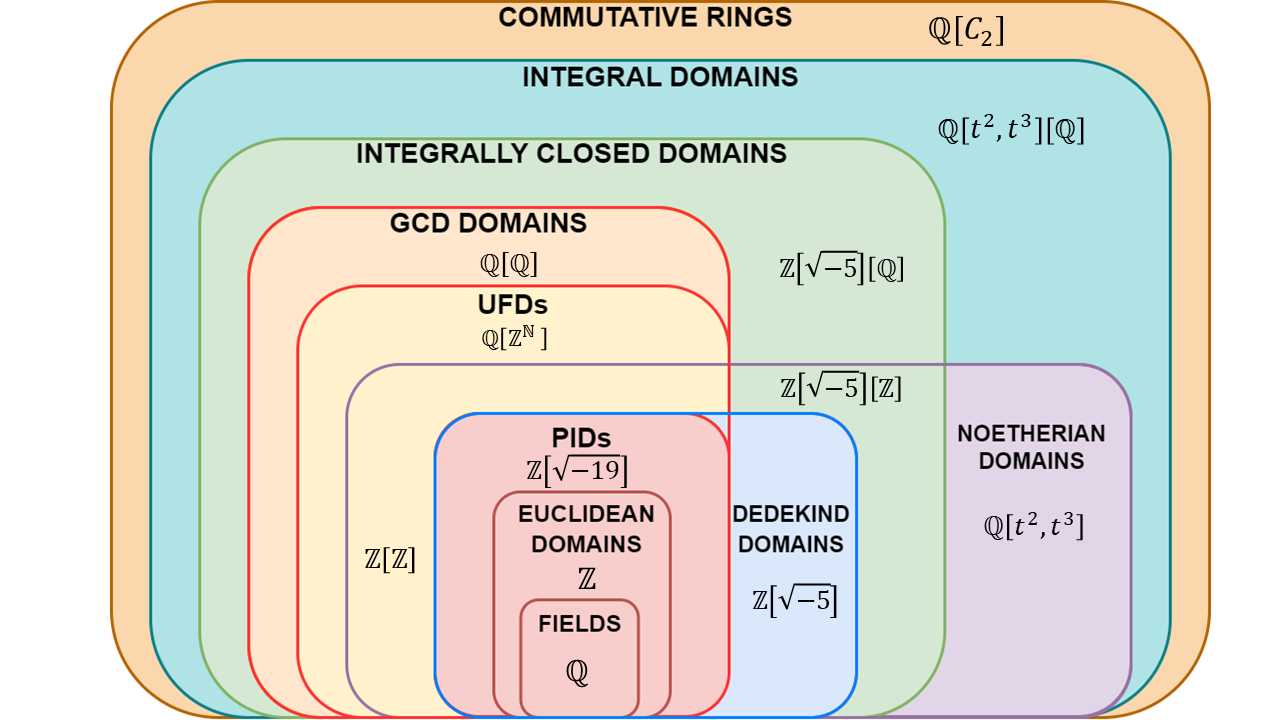
Hierarchy of several classes of rings with examples.

In algebraic geometry, UFDs arise because of smoothness. More precisely, a point in a variety (over a perfect field) is smooth if the local ring at the point is a regular local ring. A regular local ring is a UFD.

The following is a chain of class inclusions that describes the relationship between rings, domains and fields:

rngs ⊃ rings ⊃ commutative rings ⊃ integral domains ⊃ integrally closed domains ⊃ GCD domains ⊃ unique factorization domains ⊃ principal ideal domains ⊃ Euclidean domains ⊃ fields ⊃ algebraically closed fields

=== Division ring ===
A division ring is a ring such that every non-zero element is a unit. A commutative division ring is a field. A prominent example of a division ring that is not a field is the ring of quaternions. Any centralizer in a division ring is also a division ring. In particular, the center of a division ring is a field. It turned out that every finite domain (in particular finite division ring) is a field; in particular commutative (the Wedderburn's little theorem).

Every module over a division ring is a free module (has a basis); consequently, much of linear algebra can be carried out over a division ring instead of a field.

The study of conjugacy classes figures prominently in the classical theory of division rings; see, for example, the Cartan–Brauer–Hua theorem.

A cyclic algebra, introduced by L. E. Dickson, is a generalization of a quaternion algebra.

=== Semisimple rings ===
A semisimple module is a direct sum of simple modules. A semisimple ring is a ring that is semisimple as a left module (or right module) over itself.

==== Examples ====
- A division ring is semisimple (and simple).
- For any division ring D and positive integer n, the matrix ring M_{n}(D) is semisimple (and simple).
- For a field k and finite group G, the group ring kG is semisimple if and only if the characteristic of k does not divide the order of G (Maschke's theorem).
- Clifford algebras are semisimple.

The Weyl algebra over a field is a simple ring, but it is not semisimple. The same holds for a ring of differential operators in many variables.

==== Properties ====
Any module over a semisimple ring is semisimple. (Proof: A free module over a semisimple ring is semisimple and any module is a quotient of a free module.)

For a ring R, the following are equivalent:

- R is semisimple.
- R is artinian and semiprimitive.
- R is a finite direct product $\prod_{i=1}^r \operatorname{M}_{n_i}(D_i)$ where each n_{i} is a positive integer, and each D_{i} is a division ring (Artin–Wedderburn theorem).

Semisimplicity is closely related to separability. A unital associative algebra A over a field k is said to be separable if the base extension $A \otimes_k F$ is semisimple for every field extension F / k. If A happens to be a field, then this is equivalent to the usual definition in field theory (cf. separable extension.)

=== Central simple algebra and Brauer group ===
For a field k, a k-algebra is central if its center is k and is simple if it is a simple ring. Since the center of a simple k-algebra is a field, any simple k-algebra is a central simple algebra over its center. In this section, a central simple algebra is assumed to have finite dimension. Also, we mostly fix the base field; thus, an algebra refers to a k-algebra. The matrix ring of size n over a ring R will be denoted by R_{n}.

The Skolem–Noether theorem states any automorphism of a central simple algebra is inner.

Two central simple algebras A and B are said to be similar if there are integers n and m such that $A \otimes_k k_n \approx B \otimes_k k_m.$ Since $k_n \otimes_k k_m \simeq k_{nm},$ the similarity is an equivalence relation. The similarity classes [A] with the multiplication $[A][B] = \left[A \otimes_k B\right]$ form an abelian group called the Brauer group of k and is denoted by Br(k). By the Artin–Wedderburn theorem, a central simple algebra is the matrix ring of a division ring; thus, each similarity class is represented by a unique division ring.

For example, Br(k) is trivial if k is a finite field or an algebraically closed field (more generally quasi-algebraically closed field; cf. Tsen's theorem). $\operatorname{Br}(\R)$ has order 2 (a special case of the theorem of Frobenius). Finally, if k is a nonarchimedean local field (for example, $\Q _p$), then $\operatorname{Br}(k) = \Q /\Z$ through the invariant map.

Now, if F is a field extension of k, then the base extension $- \otimes_k F$ induces Br(k) → Br(F). Its kernel is denoted by Br(F / k). It consists of [A] such that $A \otimes_k F$ is a matrix ring over F (that is, A is split by F.) If the extension is finite and Galois, then Br(F / k) is canonically isomorphic to $H^2\left(\operatorname{Gal}(F/k), k^*\right).$

Azumaya algebras generalize the notion of central simple algebras to a commutative local ring.

=== Valuation ring ===
If K is a field, a valuation v is a group homomorphism from the multiplicative group K^{∗} to a totally ordered abelian group G such that, for any f, g in K with f + g nonzero, v(f + g) ≥ min{v(f), v(g)}. The valuation ring of v is the subring of K consisting of zero and all nonzero f such that v(f) ≥ 0.

Examples:

- The field of formal Laurent series $k(\!(t)\!)$ over a field k comes with the valuation v such that v(f) is the least degree of a nonzero term in f; the valuation ring of v is the formal power series ring $k[\![t]\!].$
- More generally, given a field k and a totally ordered abelian group G, let $k(\!(G)\!)$ be the set of all functions from G to k whose supports (the sets of points at which the functions are nonzero) are well ordered. It is a field with the multiplication given by convolution:
  $$(f*g)(t) = \sum_{s \in G} f(s)g(t - s).$$
  It also comes with the valuation v such that v(f) is the least element in the support of f. The subring consisting of elements with finite support is called the group ring of G (which makes sense even if G is not commutative). If G is the ring of integers, then we recover the previous example (by identifying f with the series whose nth coefficient is f(n).)

== Rings with extra structure ==
A ring may be viewed as an abelian group (by using the addition operation), with extra structure: namely, ring multiplication. In the same way, there are other mathematical objects which may be considered as rings with extra structure. For example:

- An associative algebra is a ring that is also a vector space over a field such that the scalar multiplication is compatible with the ring multiplication. For instance, the set of n-by-n matrices over the real field $\R$ has dimension n^{2} as a real vector space.
- A ring R is a topological ring if its set of elements R is given a topology which makes the addition map ($+ : R\times R \to R$) and the multiplication map ⋅ : R × R → R to be both continuous as maps between topological spaces (where X × X inherits the product topology or any other product in the category). For example, n-by-n matrices over the real numbers could be given either the Euclidean topology, or the Zariski topology, and in either case one would obtain a topological ring.
- A λ-ring is a commutative ring R together with operations λ^{n}: R → R that are like nth exterior powers:
  $$\lambda^n(x + y) = \sum_0^n \lambda^i(x) \lambda^{n-i}(y).$$

For example, $\Z$ is a λ-ring with $\lambda^n(x) = \binom{x}{n},$ the binomial coefficients. The notion plays a central rule in the algebraic approach to the Riemann–Roch theorem.

- A totally ordered ring is a ring with a total ordering that is compatible with ring operations.

== Some examples of the ubiquity of rings ==
Many different kinds of mathematical objects can be fruitfully analyzed in terms of some associated ring.

=== Cohomology ring of a topological space ===
To any topological space X one can associate its integral cohomology ring

$$H^*(X,\Z ) = \bigoplus_{i=0}^{\infty} H^i(X,\Z ),$$

a graded ring. There are also homology groups $H_i(X,\Z )$ of a space, and indeed these were defined first, as a useful tool for distinguishing between certain pairs of topological spaces, like the spheres and tori, for which the methods of point-set topology are not well-suited. Cohomology groups were later defined in terms of homology groups in a way which is roughly analogous to the dual of a vector space. To know each individual integral homology group is essentially the same as knowing each individual integral cohomology group, because of the universal coefficient theorem. However, the advantage of the cohomology groups is that there is a natural product, which is analogous to the observation that one can multiply pointwise a k-multilinear form and an l-multilinear form to get a (k + l)-multilinear form.

The ring structure in cohomology provides the foundation for characteristic classes of fiber bundles, intersection theory on manifolds and algebraic varieties, Schubert calculus and much more.

=== Burnside ring of a group ===
To any group is associated its Burnside ring which uses a ring to describe the various ways the group can act on a finite set. The Burnside ring's additive group is the free abelian group whose basis is the set of transitive actions of the group and whose addition is the disjoint union of the action. Expressing an action in terms of the basis is decomposing an action into its transitive constituents. The multiplication is easily expressed in terms of the representation ring: the multiplication in the Burnside ring is formed by writing the tensor product of two permutation modules as a permutation module. The ring structure allows a formal way of subtracting one action from another. Since the Burnside ring is contained as a finite index subring of the representation ring, one can pass easily from one to the other by extending the coefficients from integers to the rational numbers.

=== Representation ring of a group ring ===
To any group ring or Hopf algebra is associated its representation ring or "Green ring". The representation ring's additive group is the free abelian group whose basis are the indecomposable modules and whose addition corresponds to the direct sum. Expressing a module in terms of the basis is finding an indecomposable decomposition of the module. The multiplication is the tensor product. When the algebra is semisimple, the representation ring is just the character ring from character theory, which is more or less the Grothendieck group given a ring structure.

=== Function field of an irreducible algebraic variety ===
To any irreducible algebraic variety is associated its function field. The points of an algebraic variety correspond to valuation rings contained in the function field and containing the coordinate ring. The study of algebraic geometry makes heavy use of commutative algebra to study geometric concepts in terms of ring-theoretic properties. Birational geometry studies maps between the subrings of the function field.

=== Face ring of a simplicial complex ===
Every simplicial complex has an associated face ring, also called its Stanley–Reisner ring. This ring reflects many of the combinatorial properties of the simplicial complex, so it is of particular interest in algebraic combinatorics. In particular, the algebraic geometry of the Stanley–Reisner ring was used to characterize the numbers of faces in each dimension of simplicial polytopes.

== Category-theoretic description ==
Every ring can be thought of as a monoid in Ab, the category of abelian groups (thought of as a monoidal category under the tensor product of $\Z$-modules). The monoid action of a ring R on an abelian group is simply an R-module. Essentially, an R-module is a generalization of the notion of a vector space – where rather than a vector space over a field, one has a "vector space over a ring".

Let (A, +) be an abelian group and let End(A) be its endomorphism ring (see above). Note that, essentially, End(A) is the set of all morphisms of A, where if f is in End(A), and g is in End(A), the following rules may be used to compute f + g and f ⋅ g:

$$\begin{align}
& (f+g)(x) = f(x)+g(x) \\
& (f\cdot g)(x) = f(g(x)),
\end{align}$$

where + as in f(x) + g(x) is addition in A, and function composition is denoted from right to left. Therefore, associated to any abelian group, is a ring. Conversely, given any ring, (R, +, ⋅ ), (R, +) is an abelian group. Furthermore, for every r in R, right (or left) multiplication by r gives rise to a morphism of (R, +), by right (or left) distributivity. Let A = (R, +). Consider those endomorphisms of A, that "factor through" right (or left) multiplication of R. In other words, let End_{R}(A) be the set of all morphisms m of A, having the property that m(r ⋅ x) = r ⋅ m(x). It was seen that every r in R gives rise to a morphism of A: right multiplication by r. It is in fact true that this association of any element of R, to a morphism of A, as a function from R to End_{R}(A), is an isomorphism of rings. In this sense, therefore, any ring can be viewed as the endomorphism ring of some abelian X-group (by X-group, it is meant a group with X being its set of operators). In essence, the most general form of a ring, is the endomorphism group of some abelian X-group.

Any ring can be seen as a preadditive category with a single object. It is therefore natural to consider arbitrary preadditive categories to be generalizations of rings. And indeed, many definitions and theorems originally given for rings can be translated to this more general context. Additive functors between preadditive categories generalize the concept of ring homomorphism, and ideals in additive categories can be defined as sets of morphisms closed under addition and under composition with arbitrary morphisms.

== Generalization ==
Algebraists have defined structures more general than rings by weakening or dropping some of ring axioms.

=== Rng ===
A rng is the same as a ring, except that the existence of a multiplicative identity is not assumed.

=== Nonassociative ring ===
A nonassociative ring is an algebraic structure that satisfies all of the ring axioms except the associative property and the existence of a multiplicative identity. A notable example is a Lie algebra. There exists some structure theory for such algebras that generalizes the analogous results for Lie algebras and associative algebras.

=== Semiring ===
A semiring (sometimes rig) is obtained by weakening the assumption that (R, +) is an abelian group to the assumption that (R, +) is a commutative monoid, and adding the axiom that 0 ⋅ a = a ⋅ 0 = 0 for all a in R (since it no longer follows from the other axioms).

Examples:

- the non-negative integers $\{0,1,2,\ldots\}$ with ordinary addition and multiplication;
- the tropical semiring.

== Other ring-like objects ==
=== Ring object in a category ===
Let C be a category with finite products. Let pt denote a terminal object of C (an empty product). A ring object in C is an object R equipped with morphisms $R \times R\;\stackrel{a}\to\,R$ (addition), $R \times R\;\stackrel{m}\to\,R$ (multiplication), $\operatorname{pt}\stackrel{0}\to\,R$ (additive identity), $R\;\stackrel{i}\to\,R$ (additive inverse), and $\operatorname{pt}\stackrel{1}\to\,R$ (multiplicative identity) satisfying the usual ring axioms. Equivalently, a ring object is an object R equipped with a factorization of its functor of points $h_R = \operatorname{Hom}(-,R) : C^{\operatorname{op}} \to \mathbf{Sets}$ through the category of rings: $C^{\operatorname{op}} \to \mathbf{Rings} \stackrel{\textrm{forgetful}}\longrightarrow \mathbf{Sets}.$

=== Ring scheme ===
In algebraic geometry, a ring scheme over a base scheme S is a ring object in the category of S-schemes. One example is the ring scheme W_{n} over $\operatorname{Spec} \Z$, which for any commutative ring A returns the ring W_{n}(A) of p-isotypic Witt vectors of length n over A.

=== Ring spectrum ===
In algebraic topology, a ring spectrum is a spectrum X together with a multiplication $\mu : X \wedge X \to X$ and a unit map S → X from the sphere spectrum S, such that the ring axiom diagrams commute up to homotopy. In practice, it is common to define a ring spectrum as a monoid object in a good category of spectra such as the category of symmetric spectra.

== See also ==
- Algebra over a commutative ring
- Categorical ring
- Category of rings
- Glossary of ring theory
- Non-associative algebra
- Ring of sets
- Semiring
- Spectrum of a ring
- Simplicial commutative ring

Special types of rings:

- Boolean ring
- Dedekind ring
- Differential ring
- Exponential ring
- Finite ring
- Jaffard ring
- Lie ring
- Local ring
- Noetherian and artinian rings
- Ordered ring
- Poisson ring
- Reduced ring
- Regular ring
- Ring of periods
- SBI ring
- Valuation ring and discrete valuation ring
