= Semiprimitive ring =

In algebra, a semiprimitive ring or Jacobson semisimple ring or J-semisimple ring is a ring whose Jacobson radical is zero. This is a type of ring more general than a semisimple ring, but where simple modules still provide enough information about the ring. Rings such as the ring of integers are semiprimitive, and an artinian semiprimitive ring is just a semisimple ring. Semiprimitive rings can be understood as (possibly infinite) subdirect products of primitive rings, which are described by the Jacobson density theorem.

== Definition ==
A ring is called semiprimitive or Jacobson semisimple if its Jacobson radical is the zero ideal.

A ring is semiprimitive if and only if it has a faithful semisimple left module. The semiprimitive property is left-right symmetric, and so a ring is semiprimitive if and only if it has a faithful semisimple right module.

A ring is semiprimitive if and only if it is a subdirect product of left primitive rings.

A commutative ring is semiprimitive if and only if it is a subdirect product of fields, (Lam 1995, p. 137).

A left artinian ring is semiprimitive if and only if it is semisimple, (Lam 2001, p. 54). Such rings are sometimes called semisimple Artinian, (Kelarev 2002, p. 13).

== Examples ==
- The ring of integers is semiprimitive, but not semisimple.
- Every primitive ring is semiprimitive.
- The product of two fields is semiprimitive but not primitive.
- Every von Neumann regular ring is semiprimitive.

Jacobson himself has defined a ring to be "semisimple" if and only if it is a subdirect product of simple rings, (Jacobson 1989, p. 203). However, this is a stricter notion, since the endomorphism ring of a countably infinite dimensional vector space is semiprimitive, but not a subdirect product of simple rings, (Lam 1995, p. 42).
