= Jacobson radical =

Structure in ring theory (mathematics)

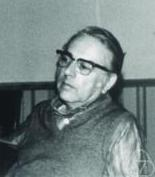
Nathan Jacobson

In mathematics, more specifically ring theory, the Jacobson radical of a ring $R$ is the ideal consisting of those elements in $R$ that annihilate all simple right $R$-modules. It happens that substituting "left" in place of "right" in the definition yields the same ideal, and so the notion is left–right symmetric. The Jacobson radical of a ring is frequently denoted by $\mathrm{J}(R)$ (or the variant $\mathrm{Jac}(R)$), $\operatorname{rad}(R)$ (or variants like $\mathfrak{r}(R)$ or $\mathfrak{R}$), or $\mathfrak{m}_R$; the former notation will be preferred in this article to avoid confusion with other radicals of a ring or a maximal ideal. The Jacobson radical is named after Nathan Jacobson, who was the first to study it for arbitrary rings in Jacobson 1945.

The Jacobson radical of a ring has numerous internal characterizations, including a few definitions that successfully extend the notion to non-unital rings. The radical of a module extends the definition of the Jacobson radical to include modules. The Jacobson radical plays a prominent role in many ring- and module-theoretic results, such as Nakayama's lemma.

== Definitions ==
There are multiple equivalent definitions and characterizations of the Jacobson radical, but it is useful to consider the definitions based on if the ring is commutative or not.

=== Commutative case ===
In the commutative case, the Jacobson radical of a commutative ring R is defined as the intersection of all maximal ideals $\mathfrak{m}$. If we denote by $\mathrm{Spm}\ R$ the set of all maximal ideals in R then

$\mathrm{J}(R) = \bigcap_{ \mathfrak{m}\,\in\,\mathrm{Spm}\ R } \mathfrak{m}.$

This definition can be used for explicit calculations in a number of simple cases, such as for local rings (R, $\mathfrak{p}$), which have a unique maximal ideal, Artinian rings, and products thereof. See the examples section for explicit computations.

==== Note on potentially confusing terminology ====
The Jacobson radical of an ideal $I\subsetneq R$ is defined as the intersection of maximal ideals of R that contain the ideal I:

$\mathrm{J}_R({I})=\bigcap_{\stackrel{\mathfrak{m}\,\in\,\mathrm{Spm}\ R}{\mathfrak{m}\supseteq I}}\mathfrak{m}.$

Thus, the Jacobson radical of the ring, $\mathrm{J}(R),$ refers to the same thing as the Jacobson radical of the zero ideal (0) of R, $\mathrm{J}_R((0))$. This is analogous to the relationship between the definitions of the radical of an ideal $I\subsetneq R$ (sometimes also called the nilradical of I), $\sqrt{I}$, and the nilradical of the ring R, $\mathfrak{N}_R=\sqrt{(0)}$.

=== Noncommutative/general case ===
For a general ring with unity $R$, the Jacobson radical $J(R)$ is defined as the ideal of all elements $r\in R$ such that $rM=0$ whenever $M$ is a simple $R$-module. That is,
$$\mathrm{J}(R) = \{r \in R \mid rM = 0 \text{ for all } M \text{ simple} \}.$$
This is equivalent to the definition in the commutative case for a commutative ring $R$ because the simple modules over a commutative ring are of the form $R/\mathfrak{m}$ for some maximal ideal $\mathfrak{m}$ of $R$, and the annihilators of $R/\mathfrak{m}$ in $R$ are precisely the elements of $\mathfrak{m}$, i.e. $\mathrm{Ann}_R(R/\mathfrak{m})=\mathfrak m$.

== Motivation ==
Understanding the Jacobson radical lies in a few different cases: namely its applications and the resulting geometric interpretations, and its algebraic interpretations.

=== Geometric applications ===
Although Jacobson originally introduced his radical as a technique for building a theory of radicals for arbitrary rings, one of the motivating reasons for why the Jacobson radical is considered in the commutative case is because of its appearance in Nakayama's lemma. This lemma is a technical tool for studying finitely generated modules over commutative rings that has an easy geometric interpretation: If we have a vector bundle E → X over a topological space X, and pick a point p ∈ X, then any basis of E|_{p} can be extended to a basis of sections of E|_{U} → U for some neighborhood p ∈ U ⊆ X.

Another application is in the case of finitely generated commutative rings of the form $R = k[x_1,\ldots, x_n]\,/\,I$ for some base ring k (such as a field, or the ring of integers). In this case the nilradical and the Jacobson radical coincide. This means we could interpret the Jacobson radical as a measure for how far the ideal I defining the ring R is from defining the ring of functions on an algebraic variety because of the Hilbert Nullstellensatz theorem. This is because algebraic varieties cannot have a ring of functions with infinitesimals: this is a structure that is only considered in scheme theory.

=== Equivalent characterizations ===
The Jacobson radical of a ring has various internal and external characterizations. The following equivalences appear in many noncommutative algebra texts such as Anderson & Fuller 1992, §15, Isaacs 1994, §13B, and Lam 2001, Ch 2.

The following are equivalent characterizations of the Jacobson radical in rings with unity (characterizations for rings without unity are given immediately afterward):

- J(R) equals the intersection of all maximal right ideals of the ring. The equivalence coming from the fact that for all maximal right ideals M, R / M is a simple right R-module, and that in fact all simple right R-modules are isomorphic to one of this type via the map from R to S given by r ↦ xr for any generator x of S. It is also true that J(R) equals the intersection of all maximal left ideals within the ring. These characterizations are internal to the ring, since one only needs to find the maximal right ideals of the ring. For example, if a ring is local, and has a unique maximal right ideal, then this unique maximal right ideal is exactly J(R). Maximal ideals are in a sense easier to look for than annihilators of modules. This characterization is deficient, however, because it does not prove useful when working computationally with J(R). The left-right symmetry of these two definitions is remarkable and has various interesting consequences. This symmetry stands in contrast to the lack of symmetry in the socles of R, for it may happen that soc(R_{R}) is not equal to soc(_{R}R). If R is a non-commutative ring, J(R) is not necessarily equal to the intersection of all maximal two-sided ideals of R. For instance, if V is a countable direct sum of copies of a field k and R = End(V) (the ring of endomorphisms of V as a k-module), then J(R) = 0 because R is known to be von Neumann regular, but there is exactly one maximal double-sided ideal in R consisting of endomorphisms with finite-dimensional image.
- J(R) equals the sum of all superfluous right ideals (or symmetrically, the sum of all superfluous left ideals) of R. Comparing this with the previous definition, the sum of superfluous right ideals equals the intersection of maximal right ideals. This phenomenon is reflected dually for the right socle of R; soc(R_{R}) is both the sum of minimal right ideals and the intersection of essential right ideals. In fact, these two relationships hold for the radicals and socles of modules in general.
- As defined in the introduction, J(R) equals the intersection of all annihilators of simple right R-modules, however it is also true that it is the intersection of annihilators of simple left modules. An ideal that is the annihilator of a simple module is known as a primitive ideal, and so a reformulation of this states that the Jacobson radical is the intersection of all primitive ideals. This characterization is useful when studying modules over rings. For instance, if U is a right R-module, and V is a maximal submodule of U, U · J(R) is contained in V, where U · J(R) denotes all products of elements of J(R) (the "scalars") with elements in U, on the right. This follows from the fact that the quotient module U / V is simple and hence annihilated by J(R).
- J(R) is the unique right ideal of R maximal with the property that every element is right quasiregular (or equivalently left quasiregular). This characterization of the Jacobson radical is useful both computationally and in aiding intuition. Furthermore, this characterization is useful in studying modules over a ring. Nakayama's lemma is perhaps the most well-known instance of this. Although every element of the J(R) is necessarily quasiregular, not every quasiregular element is necessarily a member of J(R).
- While not every quasiregular element is in J(R), it can be shown that y is in J(R) if and only if xy is left quasiregular for all x in R.
- J(R) is the set of elements x in R such that every element of 1 + RxR is a unit: J(R) = {x ∈ R | 1 + RxR ⊂ R^{×}}. In fact, y ∈ R is in the Jacobson radical if and only if 1 + xy is invertible for any x ∈ R, if and only if 1 + yx is invertible for any x ∈ R. This means xy and yx behave similarly to a nilpotent element z with z^{n+1} = 0 and (1 + z)^{−1} = 1 − z + z^{2} − ... ± z^{n}.

For rings without unity it is possible to have R = J(R); however, the equation J(R / J(R)) = {0} still holds. The following are equivalent characterizations of J(R) for rings without unity:

- The notion of left quasiregularity can be generalized in the following way. Call an element a in R left generalized quasiregular if there exists c in R such that c + a − ca = 0. Then J(R) consists of every element a for which ra is left generalized quasiregular for all r in R. It can be checked that this definition coincides with the previous quasiregular definition for rings with unity.
- For a ring without unity, the definition of a left simple module M is amended by adding the condition that R ⋅ M ≠ 0. With this understanding, J(R) may be defined as the intersection of all annihilators of simple left R modules, or just R if there are no simple left R modules. Rings without unity with no simple modules do exist, in which case R = J(R), and the ring is called a radical ring. By using the generalized quasiregular characterization of the radical, it is clear that if one finds a ring with J(R) nonzero, then J(R) is a radical ring when considered as a ring without unity.

== Examples ==
=== Commutative examples ===
- For the ring of integers Z its Jacobson radical is the zero ideal, so J(Z) = (0), because it is given by the intersection of every ideal generated by a prime number (p). Since (p_{1}) ∩ (p_{2}) = (p_{1} ⋅ p_{2}), and we are taking an infinite intersection with no common elements besides 0 between all maximal ideals, we have the computation.
- For a local ring (R, $\mathfrak{p}$) the Jacobson radical is simply J(R) = $\mathfrak{p}$. This is an important case because of its use in applying Nakayama's lemma. In particular, it implies if we have an algebraic vector bundle E → X over a scheme or algebraic variety X, and we fix a basis of E|_{p} for some point p ∈ X, then this basis lifts to a set of generators for all sections E for some neighborhood U of p.
- If k is a field and R = k[[X_{1}, ..., X_{n}]] is a ring of formal power series, then J(R) consists of those power series whose constant term is zero, i.e. the power series in the ideal (X_{1}, ..., X_{n}).
- In the case of an Artinian rings, such as C[t_{1}, t_{2}]/(t_{1}^{4}, t_{1}^{2}t_{2}^{2}, t_{2}^{9}), the Jacobson radical is (t_{1}, t_{2}).
- The previous example could be extended to the ring R = C[t_{2}, t_{3}, ...]/(t_{2}^{2}, t_{3}^{3}, ...), giving J(R) = (t_{2}, t_{3}, ...).
- The Jacobson radical of the ring Z/12Z is 6Z/12Z, which is the intersection of the maximal ideals 2Z/12Z and 3Z/12Z.
- Consider the ring C[t] ⊗_{C} C[x_{1}, x_{2}]_{x_{1}^{2}+x_{2}^{2}−1}, where the second is the localization of C[x_{1}, x_{2}] by the prime ideal $\mathfrak{p}$ = (x_{1}^{2} + x_{2}^{2} − 1). Then, the Jacobson radical is trivial because the maximal ideals are generated by an element of the form (t − z) ⊗ (x_{1}^{2} + x_{2}^{2} − 1) for z ∈ C.

=== Noncommutative examples ===
- Rings for which J(R) is {0} are called semiprimitive rings, or sometimes "Jacobson semisimple rings". The Jacobson radical of any field, any von Neumann regular ring and any left or right primitive ring is {0}.
- If K is a field and R is the ring of all upper triangular n-by-n matrices with entries in K, then J(R) consists of all upper triangular matrices with zeros on the main diagonal.
- Start with a finite, acyclic quiver Γ and a field K and consider the quiver algebra K Γ (as described in the article Quiver). The Jacobson radical of this ring is generated by all the paths in Γ of length ≥ 1.
- The Jacobson radical of a C*-algebra is {0}. This follows from the Gelfand–Naimark theorem and the fact that for a C*-algebra, a topologically irreducible *-representation on a Hilbert space is algebraically irreducible, so that its kernel is a primitive ideal in the purely algebraic sense (see Spectrum of a C*-algebra).

== Properties ==
- If R is unital and is not the trivial ring {0}, the Jacobson radical is always distinct from R since rings with unity always have maximal right ideals. However, some important theorems and conjectures in ring theory consider the case when J(R) = R – "If R is a nil ring (that is, each of its elements is nilpotent), is the polynomial ring R[x] equal to its Jacobson radical?" is equivalent to the open Köthe conjecture.
- For any ideal I contained in J(R), J(R / I) = J(R) / I.
- In particular, the Jacobson radical of the ring R / J(R) is zero. Rings with zero Jacobson radical are called semiprimitive rings.
- A ring is semisimple if and only if it is Artinian and its Jacobson radical is zero.
- If f : R → S is a surjective ring homomorphism, then f(J(R)) ⊆ J(S).
- If R is a ring with unity and M is a finitely generated left R-module with J(R)M = M, then M = 0 (Nakayama's lemma).
- J(R) contains all central nilpotent elements, but contains no idempotent elements except for 0.
- J(R) contains every nil ideal of R. If R is left or right Artinian, then J(R) is a nilpotent ideal.
  This can actually be made stronger: If
  {0} = T_{0} ⊆ T_{1} ⊆ ⋅⋅⋅ ⊆ T_{k} = R
  is a composition series for the right R-module R (such a series is sure to exist if R is right Artinian, and there is a similar left composition series if R is left Artinian), then (J(R))^{k} = 0. (Note: Proof: Since the factors T_{u} / T_{u−1} are simple right R-modules, right multiplication by any element of J(R) annihilates these factors. In other words, (T_{u} / T_{u−1}) ⋅ J(R) = 0, whence T_{u} · J(R) ⊆ T_{u−1}. Consequently, induction over i shows that all nonnegative integers i and u (for which the following makes sense) satisfy T_{u} ⋅ (J(R))^{i} ⊆ T_{u−i}. Applying this to u = i = k yields the result.)
  Note, however, that in general the Jacobson radical need not consist of only the nilpotent elements of the ring.
- If R is commutative and finitely generated as an algebra over either a field or Z, then J(R) is equal to the nilradical of R.
- The Jacobson radical of a (unital) ring is its largest superfluous right (equivalently, left) ideal.

== See also ==
- Frattini subgroup
- Nilradical of a ring
- Radical of a module
- Radical of an ideal
