= Cartan–Brauer–Hua theorem =

Result pertaining to division rings

In abstract algebra, the Cartan–Brauer–Hua theorem is a theorem concerning the structure of division rings and their multiplicative subgroups. Named after Richard Brauer, Élie Cartan, and Hua Luogeng, it characterizes division subrings that are invariant under conjugation by every nonzero element of a larger division ring.

More precisely, let $D$ be a division ring and let $K\subseteq D$ be a division subring containing the same multiplicative identity. Suppose that

$$xKx^{-1}\subseteq K
\qquad
\text{for every }x\in D^\times,$$

where $D^\times=D\setminus\{0\}$ denotes the multiplicative group of nonzero elements of $D$.

Then either

$$K\subseteq Z(D)$$

or

$$K=D,$$

where $Z(D)$ denotes the center of $D$.

Equivalently, if the multiplicative group $K^\times$ is a normal subgroup of $D^\times$, then $K$ is either central or equal to the entire division ring.

== Preliminaries ==
=== Division rings ===
A division ring is a nonzero associative ring $D$ with identity in which every nonzero element possesses a multiplicative inverse.

Unlike a field, multiplication in a division ring need not be commutative.

Thus, for arbitrary elements $a,b\in D$, it is not necessarily true that

$$ab=ba.$$

The set of nonzero elements forms a group under multiplication:

$$D^\times=(D\setminus\{0\},\cdot).$$

=== Center of a division ring ===
The center of $D$ is defined by

$$Z(D)=
\{a\in D:ax=xa
\text{ for every }x\in D\}.$$

The center is a commutative division subring and therefore a field.

An element $a\in D$ belongs to the center precisely when it is fixed under every inner automorphism:

$$xax^{-1}=a
\qquad
\text{for every }x\in D^\times.$$

=== Conjugation and normality ===
For each $x\in D^\times$, define the inner automorphism

$$\operatorname{Int}_x:D\longrightarrow D,
\qquad
\operatorname{Int}_x(a)=xax^{-1}.$$

A division subring $K$ is invariant under conjugation if

$$\operatorname{Int}_x(K)=K$$

for every $x\in D^\times$.

The condition

$$xKx^{-1}\subseteq K$$

for every nonzero $x$ already implies equality. Indeed, applying the same inclusion to $x^{-1}$ gives

$$x^{-1}Kx\subseteq K.$$

Conjugating by $x$ yields

$$K\subseteq xKx^{-1}.$$

Consequently,

$$xKx^{-1}=K.$$

It follows that

$$K^\times\trianglelefteq D^\times,$$

where $\trianglelefteq$ denotes normality.

== Statement of the theorem ==
Cartan–Brauer–Hua theorem.

Let $D$ be a division ring and let $K$ be a division subring of $D$ containing the identity of $D$.

If

$$xKx^{-1}\subseteq K
\qquad
\text{for all }x\in D^\times,$$

then

$${K\subseteq Z(D)
\quad\text{or}\quad
K=D.
}$$

Thus, a proper division subring invariant under every inner automorphism must be contained in the center.

== Proof ==
The proof uses the interaction between the additive structure of the division ring and conjugation by its nonzero elements.

=== Step 1: A conjugation identity ===
Let $a\in K^\times$ and $x\in D^\times$.

By the hypothesis,

$$xax^{-1}\in K.$$

Multiplying on the right by $x$, one obtains

$$xa=bx$$

for some $b\in K^\times$.

Suppose that $x+1\neq0$. Conjugation by $x+1$ similarly gives an element $c\in K^\times$ satisfying

$$(x+1)a=c(x+1).$$

Expanding both sides,

$$xa+a=cx+c.$$

Substituting $xa=bx$ gives

$$bx+a=cx+c.$$

Therefore,

$$(b-c)x=c-a.$$

=== Step 2: The noncentral case ===
Suppose that $a\notin Z(D)$.

Then there exists $x\in D^\times$ such that

$$xa\neq ax.$$

For such an element $x$, the equality $xa=bx$ implies

$$b\neq a.$$

Also, $x\neq-1$, since $-1$ commutes with every element of $D$.

Consequently, the identity obtained in Step 1 applies.

If $b=c$, then

$$0=c-a,$$

so $c=a$, contradicting $b\neq a$.

Thus $b-c\neq0$.

Since $K$ is a division ring, $b-c$ has an inverse in $K$. Hence

$$x=(b-c)^{-1}(c-a)\in K.$$

We have therefore established the implication

$$xa\neq ax
\quad\Longrightarrow\quad
x\in K$$

for every $x\in D^\times$.

Equivalently,

$$x\notin K
\quad\Longrightarrow\quad
xa=ax.$$

=== Step 3: Extending commutativity ===
Assume that $K\neq D$.

Choose an element

$$y\in D\setminus K.$$

By Step 2, every element of $D\setminus K$ commutes with $a$. In particular,

$$ya=ay.$$

Now let $k\in K$ be arbitrary.

Because $y\notin K$ and $k\in K$,

$$y+k\notin K.$$

Therefore Step 2 also implies

$$(y+k)a=a(y+k).$$

Expanding,

$$ya+ka=ay+ak.$$

Since $ya=ay$, cancellation gives

$$ka=ak.$$

Thus $a$ commutes with every element of $K$.

Together with Step 2, which shows that $a$ commutes with every element outside $K$, it follows that

$$a\in Z(D).$$

This contradicts the assumption that $a\notin Z(D)$.

Consequently, if $K\neq D$, every element of $K$ must be central.

Therefore,

$${
K=D
\quad\text{or}\quad
K\subseteq Z(D).
}$$

This proves the Cartan–Brauer–Hua theorem.

== Equivalent formulations ==
=== Normal multiplicative subgroups ===
The theorem can be stated entirely in terms of the multiplicative groups of division rings.

Corollary. Let $K\subseteq D$ be division rings with the same identity. If

$$K^\times\trianglelefteq D^\times,$$

then

$$K=D
\quad\text{or}\quad
K\subseteq Z(D).$$

This follows directly from the equivalence between normality of $K^\times$ and invariance of $K$ under conjugation.

=== Inner automorphism formulation ===
Let

$$\operatorname{Inn}(D)$$

denote the group of inner automorphisms of $D$.

Then the theorem states that any division subring invariant under the full action of $\operatorname{Inn}(D)$ is either central or equal to $D$.

In particular, there is no proper noncentral division subring preserved by every inner automorphism.

== Examples ==
=== Quaternion division ring ===
Let

$$D=\mathbb H$$

be the division ring of quaternions.

Its center is

$$Z(\mathbb H)=\mathbb R.$$

Consider the division subring

$$K=\mathbb R+\mathbb Ri
\cong\mathbb C.$$

Although $K$ is a proper division subring of $\mathbb H$, it is not invariant under conjugation by every nonzero quaternion.

Indeed, let

$$x=1+j.$$

Since

$$x^{-1}=\frac{1-j}{2},$$

direct calculation gives

$$xix^{-1}=-k.$$

Because

$$-k\notin K,$$

the subring $K$ is not invariant under conjugation.

This is consistent with the Cartan–Brauer–Hua theorem, since $K$ is neither central nor equal to $\mathbb H$.

=== Central subfields ===
Let $D$ be any division ring and let

$$F\subseteq Z(D)$$

be a subfield of its center.

For every $x\in D^\times$ and $a\in F$,

$$xax^{-1}=a.$$

Consequently,

$$xFx^{-1}=F.$$

Thus every central subfield satisfies the conjugation-invariance condition.

=== Commutative division rings ===
If $D$ is a field, then

$$Z(D)=D.$$

Every subfield $K\subseteq D$ is therefore central.

Hence the conclusion of the theorem holds automatically in the commutative case.

== Consequences ==
The Cartan–Brauer–Hua theorem imposes a strong restriction on the division-subring structure of a noncommutative division ring.

In particular, if $K$ is a proper division subring not contained in the center, there must exist a nonzero element $x\in D$ such that

$$xKx^{-1}\neq K.$$

Equivalently, there exist $x\in D^\times$ and $a\in K$ for which

$$xax^{-1}\notin K.$$

The theorem therefore connects the additive and multiplicative structures of division rings: the normality of a multiplicative subgroup arising from a division subring forces a restrictive conclusion about the position of that subring inside the ambient division ring.

== See also ==
- Division ring
- Skolem–Noether theorem
- Inner automorphism
- Normal subgroup
- Center (algebra)
- Quaternion
- Noncommutative ring
