= Prime ring =

Abstract algebra concept

In abstract algebra, a nonzero ring R is a prime ring if for any two elements a and b of R, arb = 0 for all r in R implies that either a = 0 or b = 0. This definition can be regarded as a simultaneous generalization of both integral domains and simple rings.

Although this article discusses the above definition, prime ring may also refer to the minimal non-zero subring of a field, which is generated by its identity element 1, and determined by its characteristic. For a characteristic 0 field, the prime ring is the integers, and for a characteristic p field (with p a prime number) the prime ring is the finite field of order p (cf. Prime field).

== Equivalent definitions ==
A ring R is prime if and only if the zero ideal {0} is a prime ideal in the noncommutative sense.

This being the case, the equivalent conditions for prime ideals yield the following equivalent conditions for R to be a prime ring:

- For any two ideals A and B of R, AB = {0} implies A = {0} or B = {0}.
- For any two right ideals A and B of R, AB = {0} implies A = {0} or B = {0}.
- For any two left ideals A and B of R, AB = {0} implies A = {0} or B = {0}.

Using these conditions it can be checked that the following are equivalent to R being a prime ring:

- All nonzero right ideals are faithful as right R-modules.
- All nonzero left ideals are faithful as left R-modules.

== Examples ==
- Any domain is a prime ring.
- Any simple ring is a prime ring, and more generally: every left or right primitive ring is a prime ring.
- Any matrix ring over an integral domain is a prime ring. In particular, the ring of 2 × 2 integer matrices is a prime ring.

== Properties ==
- A commutative ring is a prime ring if and only if it is an integral domain.
- A nonzero ring is prime if and only if the monoid of its ideals lacks zero divisors.
- The ring of matrices over a prime ring is again a prime ring.
