= Skolem–Noether theorem =

Theorem characterizing the automorphisms of simple rings

In ring theory, a branch of mathematics, the Skolem–Noether theorem characterizes the automorphisms of simple rings. It is a fundamental result in the theory of central simple algebras.

The theorem was first published by Thoralf Skolem in 1927 in his paper Zur Theorie der assoziativen Zahlensysteme (German: On the theory of associative number systems) and later rediscovered by Emmy Noether.

== Statement ==
In a general formulation, let A and B be simple unitary rings, and let k be the center of B. The center k is a field since given x nonzero in k, the simplicity of B implies that the nonzero two-sided ideal Bx = xB is the whole of B, and hence that x is a unit. If the dimension of B over k is finite, i.e. if B is a central simple algebra, and A is also a k-algebra, then given k-algebra homomorphisms

f, g : A → B,

there exists a unit b in B such that for all a in A

g(a) = b · f(a) · b^{−1}.

In particular, every automorphism of a central simple k-algebra is an inner automorphism.

== Proof ==
First suppose $B = \operatorname{M}_n(k) = \operatorname{End}_k(k^n)$. Then f and g define the actions of A on $k^n$; let $V_f, V_g$ denote the A-modules thus obtained. Since $f(1) = 1 \neq 0$ the map f is injective by simplicity of A, so A is also finite-dimensional. Hence two simple A-modules are isomorphic and $V_f, V_g$ are finite direct sums of simple A-modules. Since they have the same dimension, it follows that there is an isomorphism of A-modules $b: V_g \to V_f$. But such b must be an element of $\operatorname{M}_n(k) = B$. For the general case, $B \otimes_k B^{\text{op}}$ is a matrix algebra and that $A \otimes_k B^{\text{op}}$ is simple. By the first part applied to the maps $f \otimes 1, g \otimes1 : A \otimes_k B^{\text{op}} \to B \otimes_k B^{\text{op}}$, there exists $b \in B \otimes_k B^{\text{op}}$ such that

$$(f \otimes 1)(a \otimes z) = b (g \otimes 1)(a \otimes z) b^{-1}$$

for all $a \in A$ and $z \in B^{\text{op}}$. Taking $a = 1$, we find

$$1 \otimes z = b (1\otimes z) b^{-1}$$

for all z. That is to say, b is in $Z_{B \otimes B^{\text{op}}}(k \otimes B^{\text{op}}) = B \otimes k$ and so we can write $b = b' \otimes 1$. Taking $z = 1$ this time we find

$$f(a)= b' g(a) {b'^{-1}}$$,

which is what was sought.
