= Maximal ideal =

Ideal of a ring contained in no other ideal except the ring itself

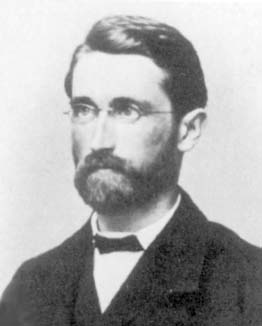
Richard Dedekind, one of the founders of ring theory

In mathematics, more specifically in ring theory, a maximal ideal is a two-sided ideal that is maximal (with respect to set inclusion) amongst all proper ideals. In other words, I is a maximal ideal of a ring R if there are no other two-sided ideals contained between I and R.

Maximal ideals are important because the quotients of rings by maximal ideals are simple rings, and in the special case of commutative rings they are also fields. The set of maximal ideals of a commutative ring R is known as the maximal spectrum of R and is variously denoted m-Spec R, Specm R, MaxSpec R, Max R, or Spm R. When equipped with the Zariski topology, it is the subspace of the closed points of the prime spectrum Spec R, the set of the prime ideals equipped with Zariski topology.

In the theory of noncommutative rings a maximal right ideal is defined analogously as being a maximal element in the poset of proper right ideals, and similarly, a maximal left ideal is defined to be a maximal element of the poset of proper left ideals. Since a one-sided maximal ideal A is not necessarily two-sided, the quotient R/A is not necessarily a ring, but it is a simple module over R. If R has a unique maximal right ideal, then R is known as a local ring, and the maximal right ideal is also the unique maximal left and unique maximal two-sided ideal of the ring, and is in fact the Jacobson radical J(R).

It is possible for a ring to have a unique maximal two-sided ideal and yet lack unique maximal one-sided ideals: for example, in the ring of 2 by 2 square matrices over a field, the zero ideal is a maximal two-sided ideal, but there are many maximal right ideals.

== Definition ==
There are other equivalent ways of expressing the definition of maximal one-sided and maximal two-sided ideals. Given a ring R and a proper ideal I of R (that is I ≠ R), I is a maximal ideal of R if any of the following equivalent conditions hold:

- There exists no other proper ideal J of R so that I ⊊ J.
- For any ideal J with I ⊆ J, either J = I or J = R.
- The quotient ring R/I is a simple ring.

There is an analogous list for one-sided ideals, for which only the right-hand versions will be given. For a right ideal A of a ring R, the following conditions are equivalent to A being a maximal right ideal of R:

- There exists no other proper right ideal B of R so that A ⊊ B.
- For any right ideal B with A ⊆ B, either B = A or B = R.
- The quotient module R/A is a simple right R-module.

Maximal right/left/two-sided ideals are the dual notion to that of minimal ideals.

== Examples ==
- If F is a field, then the only maximal ideal is {0}.
- In the ring Z of integers, the maximal ideals are the principal ideals generated by a prime number.
- More generally, all nonzero prime ideals are maximal in a principal ideal domain.
- The ideal $(2, x)$ is a maximal ideal in ring $\mathbb{Z}[x]$. Generally, the maximal ideals of $\mathbb{Z}[x]$ are of the form $(p, f(x))$ where $p$ is a prime number and $f(x)$ is a polynomial in $\mathbb{Z}[x]$ which is irreducible modulo $p$.
- Every prime ideal is a maximal ideal in a Boolean ring, i.e., a ring consisting of only idempotent elements. In fact, every prime ideal is maximal in a commutative ring $R$ whenever there exists an integer $n > 1$ such that $x^n = x$ for any $x \in R$.
- The maximal ideals of the polynomial ring $\mathbb{C}[x]$ are principal ideals generated by $x-c$ for some $c\in \mathbb{C}$.
- More generally, the maximal ideals of the polynomial ring $K[x_1,\dots,x_n]$ over an algebraically closed field K are the ideals of the form $(x_1-a_1,...,x_n-a_n)$. This result is known as the weak Nullstellensatz.
- Even more generally, let K be an algebraically closed field, $V\subseteq K^n$ be an affine algebraic set, and $\mathrm{I}(V)$ be the ideal of polynomials in $K[x_1,\dots,x_n]$ that vanish on V. Then the maximal ideals of the coordinate ring $K[V]=K[x_1,...,x_n]/\mathrm{I}(V)$ are of the form $\mathfrak{m}_a=(\overline{x_1}-a_1,...,\overline{x_n}-a_n)$, where $a=(a_1,\ldots,a_n)\in V$, and $\overline{x_i}$ are the images of $x_i$ under the natural projection map $K[x_1,\dots,x_n]\to K[V]$. Therefore, there is a one-to-one correspondence $a\leftrightarrow\mathfrak{m}_a$ between points $a\in V$ and maximal ideals $\mathfrak{m}_a\in \mathrm{Spm}(K[V])$.

== Properties ==
- An important ideal of the ring called the Jacobson radical can be defined using maximal right (or maximal left) ideals.
- If R is a unital commutative ring with an ideal m, then k = R/m is a field if and only if m is a maximal ideal. In that case, R/m is known as the residue field. This fact can fail in non-unital rings. For example, $4\mathbb{Z}$ is a maximal ideal in $2\mathbb{Z}$, but $2\mathbb{Z}/4\mathbb{Z}$ is not a field.
- If L is a maximal left ideal, then R/L is a simple left R-module. Conversely in rings with unity, any simple left R-module arises this way. Incidentally this shows that a collection of representatives of simple left R-modules is actually a set since it can be put into correspondence with part of the set of maximal left ideals of R.
- Krull's theorem (1929): Every nonzero unital ring has a maximal ideal. The result is also true if "ideal" is replaced with "right ideal" or "left ideal". More generally, it is true that every nonzero finitely generated module has a maximal submodule. Suppose I is an ideal which is not R (respectively, A is a right ideal which is not R). Then R/I is a ring with unity (respectively, R/A is a finitely generated module), and so the above theorems can be applied to the quotient to conclude that there is a maximal ideal (respectively, maximal right ideal) of R containing I (respectively, A).
- Krull's theorem can fail for rings without unity. A radical ring, i.e. a ring in which the Jacobson radical is the entire ring, has no simple modules and hence has no maximal right or left ideals. See regular ideals for possible ways to circumvent this problem.
- In a commutative ring with unity, every maximal ideal is a prime ideal. The converse is not always true: for example, in any nonfield integral domain the zero ideal is a prime ideal which is not maximal. Commutative rings in which prime ideals are maximal are known as zero-dimensional rings, where the dimension used is the Krull dimension.
- If k is a field, the preimage of a maximal ideal of a finitely generated k-algebra under a k-algebra homomorphism is a maximal ideal. However, the preimage of a maximal ideal of a unital commutative ring under a ring homomorphism is not necessarily maximal. For example, let $f:\mathbb{Z}\to\mathbb{Q}$ be the inclusion map and $\mathfrak{n}=(0)$ in $\mathbb{Q}$. Then $\mathfrak{n}$ is maximal in $\mathbb{Q}$ but $f^{-1}(\mathfrak{n})=(0)$ is not maximal in $\mathbb{Z}$.
- A maximal ideal of a noncommutative ring might not be prime in the commutative sense. For example, let $M_{n\times n}(\mathbb{Z})$ be the ring of all $n\times n$ matrices over $\mathbb{Z}$. This ring has a maximal ideal $M_{n\times n}(p\mathbb{Z})$ for any prime $p$, but this is not a prime ideal since (in the case $n=2$)$A=\text{diag}(1,p)$ and $B=\text{diag}(p,1)$ are not in $M_{n\times n}(p\mathbb{Z})$, but $AB=pI_2\in M_{n\times n}(p\mathbb{Z})$. However, maximal ideals of noncommutative rings are prime in the generalized sense below.

== Generalization ==
For an R-module A, a maximal submodule M of A is a submodule M ≠ A satisfying the property that for any other submodule N, M ⊆ N ⊆ A implies N = M or N = A. Equivalently, M is a maximal submodule if and only if the quotient module A/M is a simple module. The maximal right ideals of a ring R are exactly the maximal submodules of the module R_{R}.

Unlike rings with unity, a nonzero module does not necessarily have maximal submodules. However, as noted above, finitely generated nonzero modules have maximal submodules, and also projective modules have maximal submodules.

As with rings, one can define the radical of a module using maximal submodules. Furthermore, maximal ideals can be generalized by defining a maximal sub-bimodule M of a bimodule B to be a proper sub-bimodule of M which is contained in no other proper sub-bimodule of M. The maximal ideals of R are then exactly the maximal sub-bimodules of the bimodule _{R}R_{R}.
