= Semisimple module =

Direct sum of irreducible modules

In mathematics, especially in the area of abstract algebra known as module theory, a semisimple module or completely reducible module is a type of module that can be understood easily from its parts. A ring that is a semisimple module over itself is known as an Artinian semisimple ring. Some important rings, such as group rings of finite groups over fields of characteristic zero, are semisimple rings. An Artinian ring is initially understood via its largest semisimple quotient. The structure of Artinian semisimple rings is well understood by the Artin–Wedderburn theorem, which exhibits these rings as finite direct products of matrix rings.

For a group-theory analog of the same notion, see Semisimple representation.

== Definition ==
A module over a (not necessarily commutative) ring is said to be semisimple (or completely reducible) if it is the direct sum of simple (irreducible) submodules.

For a module M, the following are equivalent:

1. M is semisimple; i.e., a direct sum of irreducible modules.
2. M is the sum of its irreducible submodules.
3. Every submodule of M is a direct summand: for every submodule N of M, there is a complement P such that M = N ⊕ P.

For the proof of the equivalences, see Semisimple representation § Equivalent characterizations.

The most basic example of a semisimple module is a module over a field, i.e., a vector space. On the other hand, the ring Z of integers is not a semisimple module over itself, since the submodule 2Z is not a direct summand.

Semisimple is stronger than completely decomposable, which is a direct sum of indecomposable submodules.

Let A be an algebra over a field K. Then a left module M over A is said to be absolutely semisimple if, for any field extension F of K, F ⊗_{K} M is a semisimple module over F ⊗_{K} A.

== Properties ==
- If M is semisimple and N is a submodule, then N and M / N are also semisimple.
- The direct sum of (possibly infinitely many) semisimple modules is semisimple.
- A module M is finitely generated and semisimple if and only if it is Artinian and its radical is zero.

== Endomorphism rings ==
- A semisimple module M over a ring R can also be thought of as a ring homomorphism from R into the ring of abelian group endomorphisms of M. The image of this homomorphism is a semiprimitive ring, and every semiprimitive ring is isomorphic to such an image.
- The endomorphism ring of a semisimple module is not only semiprimitive, but also von Neumann regular.

== Semisimple rings ==
A ring is said to be (left-)semisimple if it is semisimple as a left module over itself. Surprisingly, a left-semisimple ring is also right-semisimple and vice versa. The left/right distinction is therefore unnecessary, and one can speak of semisimple rings without ambiguity.

A semisimple ring may be characterized in terms of homological algebra: namely, a ring R is semisimple if and only if any short exact sequence of left (or right) R-modules splits. That is, for a short exact sequence

$$0 \to A \xrightarrow{f} B \xrightarrow{g} C \to 0$$

there exists s : C → B such that the composition g ∘ s : C → C is the identity. The map s is known as a section. From this it follows that

$$B \cong A \oplus C$$

or in more exact terms

$$B \cong f(A) \oplus s(C).$$

In particular, any module over a semisimple ring is injective and projective. Since "projective" implies "flat", a semisimple ring is a von Neumann regular ring.

Semisimple rings are of particular interest to algebraists. For example, if the base ring R is semisimple, then all R-modules would automatically be semisimple. Furthermore, every simple (left) R-module is isomorphic to a minimal left ideal of R, that is, R is a left Kasch ring.

Semisimple rings are both Artinian and Noetherian. From the above properties, a ring is semisimple if and only if it is Artinian and its Jacobson radical is zero.

If an Artinian semisimple ring contains a field as a central subring, it is called a semisimple algebra.

=== Examples ===
- For a commutative ring, the four following properties are equivalent: being a semisimple ring; being Artinian and reduced; being a reduced Noetherian ring of Krull dimension 0; and being (isomorphic to) a finite direct product of fields.
- If K is a field and G is a finite group of order n, then the group ring K[G] is semisimple if and only if the characteristic of K does not divide n. This is Maschke's theorem, an important result in group representation theory.
- By the Wedderburn–Artin theorem, a unital ring R is semisimple if and only if it is (isomorphic to) M_{n_{1}}(D_{1}) × M_{n_{2}}(D_{2}) × ... × M_{n_{r}}(D_{r}), where each D_{i} is a division ring and each n_{i} is a positive integer, and M_{n}(D) denotes the ring of n-by-n matrices with entries in D.
- An example of a semisimple non-unital ring is M_{∞}(K), the row-finite, column-finite, infinite matrices over a field K.

=== Simple rings ===
One should beware that despite the terminology, not all simple rings are semisimple. The problem is that the ring may be "too big", that is, not (left/right) Artinian. In fact, if R is a simple ring with a minimal left/right ideal, then R is semisimple.

Classic examples of simple, but not semisimple, rings are the Weyl algebras, such as the Q-algebra

$$A=\mathbf{Q}{\langle x,y \rangle }/\langle xy-yx-1\rangle\ ,$$

which is a simple noncommutative domain. These and many other nice examples are discussed in more detail in several noncommutative ring theory texts, including chapter 3 of Lam's text, in which they are described as nonartinian simple rings. The module theory for the Weyl algebras is well studied and differs significantly from that of semisimple rings.

=== Jacobson semisimple ===
A ring is called Jacobson semisimple (or J-semisimple or semiprimitive) if the intersection of the maximal left ideals is zero, that is, if the Jacobson radical is zero. Every ring that is semisimple as a module over itself has zero Jacobson radical, but not every ring with zero Jacobson radical is semisimple as a module over itself. A J-semisimple ring is semisimple if and only if it is an Artinian ring, so semisimple rings are often called Artinian semisimple rings to avoid confusion.

For example, the ring of integers, Z, is J-semisimple, but not Artinian semisimple.

== See also ==
- Socle
- Semisimple algebra
