= Wedderburn–Artin theorem =

Classification of semi-simple rings and algebras

In algebra, the Wedderburn–Artin theorem is a classification theorem for semisimple rings and semisimple algebras. The theorem states that a(n Artinian) (Note: By the definition used here, semisimple rings are automatically Artinian rings. However, some authors use "semisimple" differently, to mean that the ring has a trivial Jacobson radical. For Artinian rings, the two notions are equivalent, so "Artinian" is included here to eliminate that ambiguity.) semisimple ring R is isomorphic to the product of finitely many n_{i}-by-n_{i} matrix rings over division rings D_{i}, for some integers n_{i}, both of which are uniquely determined up to permutation of the index i. In particular, any simple left or right Artinian ring is isomorphic to an n-by-n matrix ring over a division ring D, where both n and D are uniquely determined.

== Theorem ==
Let R be a (Artinian) semisimple ring. Then the Wedderburn–Artin theorem states that R is isomorphic to the product of finitely many n_{i}-by-n_{i} matrix rings $M_{n_i}(D_i)$ over division rings D_{i}, for some integers n_{i}, both of which are uniquely determined up to permutation of the index i.

There is also a version of the Wedderburn–Artin theorem for algebras over a field k. If R is a finite-dimensional semisimple k-algebra, then each D_{i} in the above statement is a finite-dimensional division algebra over k. The center of each D_{i} need not be k; it could be a finite extension of k.

Note that if R is a finite-dimensional simple algebra over a division ring E, D need not be contained in E. For example, matrix rings over the complex numbers are finite-dimensional simple algebras over the real numbers.

== Proof ==
There are various proofs of the Wedderburn–Artin theorem. A common modern one takes the following approach.

Suppose the ring $R$ is semisimple. Then the right $R$-module $R_R$ is isomorphic to a finite direct sum of simple modules (which are the same as minimal right ideals of $R$). Write this direct sum as

$$R_R  \;\cong\; \bigoplus_{i=1}^m I_i^{\oplus n_i}$$

where the $I_i$ are mutually nonisomorphic simple right $R$-modules, the ith one appearing with multiplicity $n_i$. This gives an isomorphism of endomorphism rings

$$\mathrm{End}(R_R)
\;\cong\;
\bigoplus_{i=1}^m \mathrm{End}\big(I_i^{\oplus n_i}\big)$$

and we can identify $\mathrm{End}\big(I_i^{\oplus n_i}\big)$ with a ring of matrices

$$\mathrm{End}\big(I_i^{\oplus n_i}\big) \;\cong\; M_{n_i}\big(\mathrm{End}(I_i)\big)$$

where the endomorphism ring $\mathrm{End}(I_i)$ of $I_i$ is a division ring by Schur's lemma, because $I_i$ is simple. Since $R \cong \mathrm{End}(R_R)$ we conclude

$$R \;\cong\;
\bigoplus_{i=1}^m M_{n_i}\big(\mathrm{End}(I_i)\big)
\,.$$

Here we used right modules because $R \cong \mathrm{End}(R_R)$; if we used left modules $R$ would be isomorphic to the opposite algebra of $\mathrm{End}({}_R R)$, but the proof would still go through. To see this proof in a larger context, see Decomposition of a module. For the proof of an important special case, see Simple Artinian ring.

== Consequences ==
Since a finite-dimensional algebra over a field is Artinian, the Wedderburn–Artin theorem implies that every finite-dimensional simple algebra over a field is isomorphic to an n-by-n matrix ring over some finite-dimensional division algebra D over $k$, where both n and D are uniquely determined. This was shown by Joseph Wedderburn. Emil Artin later generalized this result to the case of simple left or right Artinian rings.

Since the only finite-dimensional division algebra over an algebraically closed field is the field itself, the Wedderburn–Artin theorem has strong consequences in this case. Let R be a semisimple ring that is a finite-dimensional algebra over an algebraically closed field $k$. Then R is a finite product $\textstyle \prod_{i=1}^r M_{n_i}(k)$ where the $n_i$ are positive integers and $M_{n_i}(k)$ is the algebra of $n_i \times n_i$ matrices over $k$.

Furthermore, the Wedderburn–Artin theorem reduces the problem of classifying finite-dimensional central simple algebras over a field $k$ to the problem of classifying finite-dimensional central division algebras over $k$: that is, division algebras over $k$ whose center is $k$. It implies that any finite-dimensional central simple algebra over $k$ is isomorphic to a matrix algebra $\textstyle M_{n}(D)$ where $D$ is a finite-dimensional central division algebra over $k$.

== See also ==
- Maschke's theorem
- Brauer group
- Jacobson density theorem
- Hypercomplex number
- Emil Artin
- Joseph Wedderburn
