= Artinian ring =

Ring in abstract algebra

In mathematics, specifically abstract algebra, an Artinian ring (sometimes Artin ring) is a ring that satisfies the descending chain condition on (one-sided) ideals; that is, there is no infinite descending sequence of ideals. Artinian rings are named after Emil Artin, who first discovered that the descending chain condition for ideals simultaneously generalizes finite rings and rings that are finite-dimensional vector spaces over fields. The definition of Artinian rings may be restated by interchanging the descending chain condition with an equivalent notion: the minimum condition.

Precisely, a ring is left Artinian if it satisfies the descending chain condition on left ideals, right Artinian if it satisfies the descending chain condition on right ideals, and Artinian or two-sided Artinian if it is both left and right Artinian. For commutative rings the left and right definitions coincide, but in general they are distinct from each other.

The Wedderburn–Artin theorem characterizes every simple Artinian ring as a ring of matrices over a division ring. This implies that a simple ring is left Artinian if and only if it is right Artinian.

The same definition and terminology can be applied to modules, with ideals replaced by submodules.

Although the descending chain condition appears dual to the ascending chain condition, in rings it is in fact the stronger condition. Specifically, a consequence of the Akizuki–Hopkins–Levitzki theorem is that a left (resp. right) Artinian ring is automatically a left (resp. right) Noetherian ring. This is not true for general modules; that is, an Artinian module need not be a Noetherian module.

== Examples and counterexamples ==
- An integral domain is Artinian if and only if it is a field.
- A ring with finitely many, say left, ideals is left Artinian. In particular, a finite ring (e.g., $\mathbb{Z}/n \mathbb{Z}$) is left and right Artinian.
- Let $k$ be a field. Then $k[t]/(t^n)$ is Artinian for every positive integer n.
- Similarly, $k[x,y]/(x^2, y^3, xy^2) = k \oplus k\cdot x \oplus k \cdot y \oplus k\cdot xy \oplus k \cdot y^2$ is an Artinian ring with maximal ideal $(x,y)$.
- Let $x$ be an endomorphism between a finite-dimensional vector space V. Then the subalgebra $A \subset \operatorname{End}(V)$ generated by $x$ is a commutative Artinian ring.
- If I is a nonzero ideal of a Dedekind domain A, then $A/I$ is a principal Artinian ring.
- For each $n \ge 1$, the full matrix ring $M_n(R)$ over a left Artinian (resp. left Noetherian) ring R is left Artinian (resp. left Noetherian).

The following two are examples of non-Artinian rings.

- If R is any ring, then the polynomial ring R[x] is not Artinian, since the ideal generated by $x^{n+1}$ is (properly) contained in the ideal generated by $x^n$ for all natural numbers n. In contrast, if R is Noetherian so is R[x] by the Hilbert basis theorem.
- The ring of integers $\mathbb{Z}$ is a Noetherian ring but is not Artinian.

== Modules over Artinian rings ==
Let M be a left module over a left Artinian ring. Then the following are equivalent (Hopkins' theorem): (i) M is finitely generated, (ii) M has finite length (i.e., has composition series), (iii) M is Noetherian, (iv) M is Artinian.

== Commutative Artinian rings ==
Let A be a commutative Noetherian ring with unity. Then the following are equivalent.

- A is Artinian.
- A is a finite product of commutative Artinian local rings.
- A / nil(A) is a semisimple ring, where nil(A) is the nilradical of A.
- Every finitely generated module over A has finite length. (see above)
- A has Krull dimension zero. (In particular, the nilradical is the Jacobson radical since prime ideals are maximal.)
- $\operatorname{Spec}A$ is finite and discrete.
- $\operatorname{Spec}A$ is discrete.

Let k be a field and A a finitely generated k-algebra. Then A is Artinian if and only if A is finitely generated as a k-module.

An Artinian local ring is complete. A quotient and localization of an Artinian ring is Artinian.

== Simple Artinian ring ==
One version of the Wedderburn–Artin theorem states that a simple Artinian ring A is a matrix ring over a division ring. Indeed, let I be a minimal (nonzero) right ideal of A, which exists since A is Artinian (and the rest of the proof does not use the fact that A is Artinian). Then, since $AI$ is a two-sided ideal, $AI = A$ since A is simple. Thus, we can choose $a_i \in A$ so that $1 \in a_1 I + \cdots + a_k I$. Assume k is minimal with respect to that property. Now consider the map of right A-modules:

$$\begin{cases} I^{\oplus k} \to A, \\ (y_1, \dots, y_k) \mapsto a_1y_1 + \cdots + a_k y_k \end{cases}$$

This map is surjective, since the image is a right ideal and contains 1. If it is not injective, then, say, $a_1y_1 = a_2y_2 + \cdots + a_k y_k$ with nonzero $y_1$. Then, by the minimality of I, we have $y_1 A = I$. It follows:

$$a_1 I = a_1 y_1 A \subset a_2 I + \cdots + a_k I$$,

which contradicts the minimality of k. Hence, $I^{\oplus k} \simeq A$ and thus $A \simeq \operatorname{End}_A(A) \simeq M_k(\operatorname{End}_A(I))$.

== See also ==
- Artin algebra
- Artinian ideal
- Serial module
- Semiperfect ring
- Gorenstein ring
- Noetherian ring
