= Center (ring theory) =

Subring consisting of the elements x

In algebra, the center of a ring R is the subring consisting of the elements x such that xy = yx for all elements y in R. It is a commutative ring and is denoted as Z(R); 'Z' stands for the German word Zentrum, meaning "center".

If R is a ring, then R is an associative algebra over its center. Conversely, if R is an associative algebra over a commutative subring S, then S is a subring of the center of R, and if S happens to be the center of R, then the algebra R is called a central algebra.

== Examples ==
- The center of a commutative ring R is R itself.
- The center of a skew-field is a field.
- The center of the (full) matrix ring with entries in a commutative ring R consists of R-scalar multiples of the identity matrix.
- Let F be a field extension of a field k, and R an algebra over k. Then $\operatorname{Z}(R \otimes_k F) = \operatorname{Z}(R) \otimes_k F$.
- The center of the universal enveloping algebra of a Lie algebra plays an important role in the representation theory of Lie algebras. For example, a Casimir element is an element of such a center that is used to analyze Lie algebra representations. See also: Harish-Chandra isomorphism.
- The center of a simple algebra is a field.

== See also ==
- Center of a group
- Central simple algebra
- Morita equivalence
