= Glossary of module theory =

Module theory is the branch of mathematics in which modules are studied. This is a glossary of some terms of the subject.

See also: Glossary of linear algebra, Glossary of ring theory, Glossary of representation theory.

== A ==
algebraically compact
algebraically compact module (also called pure injective module) is a module in which all systems of equations can be decided by finitary means. Alternatively, those modules which leave pure-exact sequence exact after applying Hom.
annihilator
1. The annihilator of a left $R$-module $M$ is the set $\textrm{Ann}(M) := \{ r \in R ~|~ rm = 0 \, \forall m \in M \}$ . It is a (two-sided) ideal of $R$.
2. The annihilator of an element $m \in M$ is the set $\textrm{Ann}(m) := \{ r \in R ~|~ rm = 0 \}$. It is a left ideal.
Artinian
An Artinian module is a module in which every decreasing chain of submodules becomes stationary after finitely many steps.
associated prime
1. associated prime
automorphism
An automorphism is an endomorphism that is also an isomorphism.
Azumaya
Azumaya's theorem says that two decompositions into modules with local endomorphism rings are equivalent.

== B ==
balanced
balanced module
basis
A basis of a module $M$ is a set of elements in $M$ such that every element in the module can be expressed as a finite sum of elements in the basis in a unique way.
Beauville–Laszlo
Beauville–Laszlo theorem
big
"big" usually means "not-necessarily finitely generated".
bimodule
bimodule
brick
in the context of an algebra R over a field K, an R-module M is a brick if the endomorphism ring End_{R}(M) is isomorphic to K.

== C ==
canonical module
canonical module (the term "canonical" comes from canonical divisor)
category
The category of modules over a ring is the category where the objects are all the (say) left modules over the given ring and the morphisms module homomorphisms.
character
character module
chain complex
chain complex (frequently just complex)
closed submodule
A module is called a closed submodule if it does not contain any essential extension.
Cohen–Macaulay
Cohen–Macaulay module
coherent
A coherent module is a finitely generated module whose finitely generated submodules are finitely presented.
cokernel
The cokernel of a module homomorphism is the codomain quotiented by the image.
compact
A compact module
completely reducible
Synonymous to "semisimple module".
completion
completion of a module
composition
Jordan Hölder composition series
continuous
continuous module
countably generated
A countably generated module is a module that admits a generating set whose cardinality is at most countable.
cyclic
A module is called a cyclic module if it is generated by one element.

== D ==
D
A D-module is a module over a ring of differential operators.
decomposition
A decomposition of a module is a way to express a module as a direct sum of submodules.
dense
dense submodule
determinant
The determinant of a finite free module over a commutative ring is the r-th exterior power of the module when r is the rank of the module.
differential
A differential graded module or dg-module is a graded module with a differential.
direct sum
A direct sum of modules is a module that is the direct sum of the underlying abelian group together with component-wise scalar multiplication.
directing
An indecomposable module M is directing if there is no cycle of module homomorphisms $f_0: M \to M_1, f_1: M_1 \to M_2, ..., f_{n-1}: M_{n-1} \to M$ such that for all i, $f_i$ is neither zero nor an isomorphism.
dual module
The dual module of a module M over a commutative ring R is the module $\operatorname{Hom}_R(M, R)$.
dualizing
dualizing module
Drinfeld
A Drinfeld module is a module over a ring of functions on algebraic curve with coefficients from a finite field.

== E ==
Eilenberg–Mazur
Eilenberg–Mazur swindle
elementary
elementary divisor
endomorphism
1. An endomorphism is a module homomorphism from a module to itself.
2. The endomorphism ring is the set of all module homomorphisms with addition as addition of functions and multiplication composition of functions.
enough
enough injectives
enough projectives
essential
Given a module M, an essential submodule N of M is a submodule that every nonzero submodule of M intersects non-trivially.
exact
exact sequence
Ext functor
Ext functor
extension
Extension of scalars uses a ring homomorphism from R to S to convert R-modules to S-modules.

== F ==
faithful
A faithful module $M$ is one where the action of each nonzero $r \in R$ on $M$ is nontrivial (i.e. $rx \ne 0$ for some $x$ in $M$). Equivalently, $\textrm{Ann}(M)$ is the zero ideal.
finite
The term "finite module" is another name for a finitely generated module.
finite length
A module of finite length is a module that admits a (finite) composition series.
finite presentation
1. A finite free presentation of a module M is an exact sequence $F_1 \to F_0 \to M$ where $F_i$ are finitely generated free modules.
2. A finitely presented module is a module that admits a finite free presentation.
finitely generated
A module $M$ is finitely generated if there exist finitely many elements $x_1,...,x_n$ in $M$ such that every element of $M$ is a finite linear combination of those elements with coefficients from the scalar ring $R$.
fitting
1. fitting ideal
2. Fitting's lemma
five
Five lemma
flat
A $R$-module $F$ is called a flat module if the tensor product functor $- \otimes_R F$ is exact.
In particular, every projective module is flat.
free
A free module is a module that has a basis, or equivalently, one that is isomorphic to a direct sum of copies of the scalar ring $R$.
Frobenius reciprocity
Frobenius reciprocity.

== G ==
Galois
A Galois module is a module over the group ring of a Galois group.
generating set
A subset of a module is called a generating set of the module if the submodule generated by the set (i.e., the smallest subset containing the set) is the entire module itself.
global
global dimension
graded
A module $M$ over a graded ring $A = \bigoplus_{n\in \mathbb N}A_n$ is a graded module if $M$ can be expressed as a direct sum $\bigoplus_{i\in \mathbb N}M_i$ and $A_i M_j \subseteq M_{i+j}$.

== H ==
Herbrand quotient
A Herbrand quotient of a module homomorphism is another term for index.
Hilbert
1. Hilbert's syzygy theorem
2. The Hilbert–Poincaré series of a graded module.
3. The Hilbert–Serre theorem tells when a Hilbert–Poincaré series is a rational function.
homological dimension
homological dimension
homomorphism
For two left $R$-modules $M_1, M_2$, a group homomorphism $\phi: M_1 \to M_2$ is called homomorphism of $R$-modules if $r \phi(m) = \phi (r m) \, \forall r \in R, m \in M_1$ .
Hom
Hom functor

== I ==
idempotent
An idempotent is an endomorphism whose square is itself.
indecomposable
An indecomposable module is a non-zero module that cannot be written as a direct sum of two non-zero submodules. Every simple module is indecomposable (but not conversely).
index
The index of an endomorphism $f : M \to M$ is the difference $\operatorname{length}(\operatorname{coker}(f)) - \operatorname{length}(\operatorname{ker}(f))$, when the cokernel and kernel of $f$ have finite length.
injective
1. A $R$-module $Q$ is called an injective module if given a $R$-module homomorphism $g: X \to Q$, and an injective $R$-module homomorphism $f: X \to Y$, there exists a $R$-module homomorphism $h : Y \to Q$ such that $f \circ h = g$.

The module Q is injective if the diagram commutes

The following conditions are equivalent:
- The contravariant functor $\textrm{Hom}_R( - , I)$ is exact.
- $I$ is a injective module.
- Every short exact sequence $0 \to I \to L \to L' \to 0$ is split.

2. An injective envelope (also called injective hull) is a maximal essential extension, or a minimal embedding in an injective module.
3. An injective cogenerator is an injective module such that every module has a nonzero homomorphism into it.
invariant
invariants
invertible
An invertible module over a commutative ring is a rank-one finite projective module.
irreducible module
Another name for a simple module.
isomorphism
An isomorphism between modules is an invertible module homomorphism.

== J ==
Jacobson
Jacobson's density theorem

== K ==
Kähler differentials
Kähler differentials
Kaplansky
Kaplansky's theorem on a projective module says that a projective module over a local ring is free.
kernel
The kernel of a module homomorphism is the pre-image of the zero element.
Koszul complex
Koszul complex
Krull–Schmidt
The Krull–Schmidt theorem says that (1) a finite-length module admits an indecomposable decomposition and (2) any two indecomposable decompositions of it are equivalent.

== L ==
length
The length of a module is the common length of any composition series of the module; the length is infinite if there is no composition series. Over a field, the length is more commonly known as the dimension.
linear
1. A linear map is another term for a module homomorphism.
2. Linear topology
localization
Localization of a module converts R modules to S modules, where S is a localization of R.

== M ==
Matlis module
Matlis module
Mitchell's embedding theorem
Mitchell's embedding theorem
Mittag-Leffler
Mittag-Leffler condition (ML)
module
1. A left module $M$ over the ring $R$ is an abelian group $(M, +)$ with an operation $R \times M \to M$ (called scalar multipliction) satisfies the following condition:

$$\forall r,s \in R, \forall m,n \in M$$,

1. $r (m + n) = rm + rn$
2. $r (s m) = (r s) m$
3. $1_R \, m = m$

2. A right module $M$ over the ring $R$ is an abelian group $(M, +)$ with an operation $M \times R \to M$ satisfies the following condition:

$$\forall r,s \in R, \forall m,n \in M$$,

1. $(m + n) r = m r + n r$
2. $(m s) r = m (s r)$
3. $m 1_R = m$

3. All the modules together with all the module homomorphisms between them form the category of modules.
module spectrum
A module spectrum is a spectrum with an action of a ring spectrum.

== N ==
nilpotent
A nilpotent endomorphism is an endomorphism, some power of which is zero.
Noetherian
A Noetherian module is a module such that every submodule is finitely generated. Equivalently, every increasing chain of submodules becomes stationary after finitely many steps.
normal
normal forms for matrices

== P ==
perfect
1. perfect complex
2. perfect module
principal
A principal indecomposable module is a cyclic indecomposable projective module.
primary
primary submodule
projective

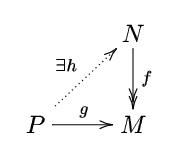
The characteristic property of projective modules is called lifting.

A $R$-module $P$ is called a projective module if given a $R$-module homomorphism $g: P \to M$, and a surjective $R$-module homomorphism $f: N \to M$, there exists a $R$-module homomorphism $h : P \to N$ such that $f \circ h = g$.

The following conditions are equivalent:
- The covariant functor $\textrm{Hom}_R(P, - )$ is exact.
- $M$ is a projective module.
- Every short exact sequence $0 \to L \to L' \to P \to 0$ is split.
- $M$ is a direct summand of free modules.
In particular, every free module is projective.

2. The projective dimension of a module is the minimal length of (if any) a finite projective resolution of the module; the dimension is infinite if there is no finite projective resolution.
3. A projective cover is a minimal surjection from a projective module.
pure submodule
pure submodule

== Q ==
Quillen–Suslin theorem
The Quillen–Suslin theorem states that a finite projective module over a polynomial ring is free.
quotient
Given a left $R$-module $M$ and a submodule $N$, the quotient group $M/N$ can be made to be a left $R$-module by $r(m+N) = rm + N$ for $r \in R, \, m \in M$. It is called a quotient module or factor module.

== R ==
radical
The radical of a module is the intersection of the maximal submodules. For Artinian modules, the smallest submodule with semisimple quotient.
rational
rational canonical form
reflexive
A reflexive module is a module that is isomorphic via the natural map to its second dual.
resolution
resolution
restriction
Restriction of scalars uses a ring homomorphism from R to S to convert S-modules to R-modules.

== S ==
Schanuel
Schanuel's lemma
Schur
Schur's lemma says that the endomorphism ring of a simple module is a division ring.
Shapiro
Shapiro's lemma
sheaf of modules
sheaf of modules
snake
snake lemma
socle
The socle is the largest semisimple submodule.
semisimple
A semisimple module is a direct sum of simple modules.
simple
A simple module is a nonzero module whose only submodules are zero and itself.
Smith
Smith normal form
stably free
A stably free module
structure theorem
The structure theorem for finitely generated modules over a principal ideal domain says that a finitely generated modules over PIDs are finite direct sums of primary cyclic modules.
submodule
Given a $R$-module $M$, an additive subgroup $N$ of $M$ is a submodule if $RN \subset N$.
support
The support of a module over a commutative ring is the set of prime ideals at which the localizations of the module are nonzero.

== T ==
tensor
Tensor product of modules
topological
A topological module
Tor
Tor functor
torsion-free
torsion-free module
torsionless
torsionless module

== U ==
uniform
A uniform module is a module in which every two non-zero submodules have a non-zero intersection.

== W ==
weak
weak dimension

== Z ==
zero
1. The zero module is a module consisting of only zero element.
2. The zero module homomorphism is a module homomorphism that maps every element to zero.
