= Decomposition of a module =

Abstract algebra concept

In abstract algebra, a decomposition of a module is a way to write a module as a direct sum of modules. A type of a decomposition is often used to define or characterize modules: for example, a semisimple module is a module that has a decomposition into simple modules. Given a ring, the types of decomposition of modules over the ring can also be used to define or characterize the ring: a ring is semisimple if and only if every module over it is a semisimple module.

An indecomposable module is a module that is not a direct sum of two nonzero submodules. Azumaya's theorem states that if a module has an decomposition into modules with local endomorphism rings, then all decompositions into indecomposable modules are equivalent to each other; a special case of this, especially in group theory, is known as the Krull–Schmidt theorem.

A special case of a decomposition of a module is a decomposition of a ring: for example, a ring is semisimple if and only if it is a direct sum (in fact a product) of matrix rings over division rings (this observation is known as the Artin–Wedderburn theorem).

== Idempotents and decompositions ==
To give a direct sum decomposition of a module into submodules is the same as to give orthogonal idempotents in the endomorphism ring of the module that sum up to the identity map. Indeed, if $M = \bigoplus_{i \in I} M_i$, then, for each $i \in I$, the linear endomorphism $e_i : M \to M_i \hookrightarrow M$ given by the natural projection followed by the natural inclusion is an idempotent. They are clearly orthogonal to each other ($e_i e_j = 0$ for $i \ne j$) and they sum up to the identity map:

$$1_{\operatorname{M}} = \sum_{i \in I} e_i$$

as endomorphisms (here the summation is well-defined since it is a finite sum at each element of the module). Conversely, each set of orthogonal idempotents $\{ e_i \}_{i \in I}$ such that only finitely many $e_i(x)$ are nonzero for each $x \in M$ and $\sum e_i = 1_M$ determine a direct sum decomposition by taking $M_i$ to be the images of $e_i$.

This fact already puts some constraints on a possible decomposition of a ring: given a ring $R$, suppose there is a decomposition

$${}_R R = \bigoplus_{a \in A} I_a$$

of $R$ as a left module over itself, where $I_a$ are left submodules; i.e., left ideals. Each endomorphism ${}_R R \to {}_R R$ can be identified with a right multiplication by an element of R; thus, $I_a = R e_a$ where $e_a$ are idempotents of $\operatorname{End}({}_R R) \simeq R$. The summation of idempotent endomorphisms corresponds to the decomposition of the unity of R: $1_R = \sum_{a \in A} e_a \in \bigoplus_{a \in A} I_a$, which is necessarily a finite sum; in particular, $A$ must be a finite set.

For example, take $R = \operatorname{M}_n(D)$, the ring of n-by-n matrices over a division ring D. Then ${}_R R$ is the direct sum of n copies of $D^n$, the columns; each column is a simple left R-submodule or, in other words, a minimal left ideal.

Let R be a ring. Suppose there is a (necessarily finite) decomposition of it as a left module over itself

$${}_R R = R_1 \oplus \cdots \oplus R_n$$

into two-sided ideals $R_i$ of R. As above, $R_i = R e_i$ for some orthogonal idempotents $e_i$ such that $\textstyle{1 = \sum_1^n e_i}$. Since $R_i$ is an ideal, $e_i R \subset R_i$ and so $e_i R e_j \subset R_i \cap R_j = 0$ for $i \ne j$. Then, for each i,

$$e_i r = \sum_j e_j r e_i = \sum_j e_i r e_j = r e_i.$$

That is, the $e_i$ are in the center; i.e., they are central idempotents. Clearly, the argument can be reversed and so there is a one-to-one correspondence between the direct sum decomposition into ideals and the orthogonal central idempotents summing up to the unity 1. Also, each $R_i$ itself is a ring on its own right, the unity given by $e_i$, and, as a ring, R is the product ring $R_1 \times \cdots \times R_n.$

For example, again take $R = \operatorname{M}_n(D)$. This ring is a simple ring; in particular, it has no nontrivial decomposition into two-sided ideals.

== Types of decomposition ==
There are several types of direct sum decompositions that have been studied:

- Semisimple decomposition: a direct sum of simple modules.
- Indecomposable decomposition: a direct sum of indecomposable modules.
- A decomposition with local endomorphism rings (cf. #Azumaya's theorem): a direct sum of modules whose endomorphism rings are local rings (a ring is local if for each element x, either x or 1 − x is a unit).
- Serial decomposition: a direct sum of uniserial modules (a module is uniserial if the lattice of submodules is a finite chain).

Since a simple module is indecomposable, a semisimple decomposition is an indecomposable decomposition (but not conversely). If the endomorphism ring of a module is local, then, in particular, it cannot have a nontrivial idempotent: the module is indecomposable. Thus, a decomposition with local endomorphism rings is an indecomposable decomposition.

A direct summand is said to be maximal if it admits an indecomposable complement. A decomposition $\textstyle{M = \bigoplus_{i \in I} M_i}$ is said to complement maximal direct summands if for each maximal direct summand L of M, there exists a subset $J \subset I$ such that

$M = \left(\bigoplus_{j \in J} M_j \right) \bigoplus L.$

Two decompositions $M = \bigoplus_{i \in I} M_i = \bigoplus_{j \in J} N_j$ are said to be equivalent if there is a bijection $\varphi : I \overset{\sim}\to J$ such that for each $i \in I$, $M_i \simeq N_{\varphi(i)}$. If a module admits an indecomposable decomposition complementing maximal direct summands, then any two indecomposable decompositions of the module are equivalent.

== Azumaya's theorem ==
In the simplest form, Azumaya's theorem states: given a decomposition $M = \bigoplus_{i \in I} M_i$ such that the endomorphism ring of each $M_i$ is local (so the decomposition is indecomposable), each indecomposable decomposition of M is equivalent to this given decomposition. The more precise version of the theorem states: still given such a decomposition, if $M = N \oplus K$, then

1. if nonzero, N contains an indecomposable direct summand,
2. if $N$ is indecomposable, the endomorphism ring of it is local and $K$ is complemented by the given decomposition:
  $M = M_j \oplus K$ and so $M_j \simeq N$ for some $j \in I$,
3. for each $i \in I$, there exist direct summands $N'$ of $N$ and $K'$ of $K$ such that $M = M_i \oplus N' \oplus K'$.

The endomorphism ring of an indecomposable module of finite length is local (e.g., by Fitting's lemma) and thus Azumaya's theorem applies to the setup of the Krull–Schmidt theorem. Indeed, if M is a module of finite length, then, by induction on length, it has a finite indecomposable decomposition $M = \bigoplus_{i=1}^n M_i$, which is a decomposition with local endomorphism rings. Now, suppose we are given an indecomposable decomposition $M = \bigoplus_{i=1}^m N_i$. Then it must be equivalent to the first one: so $m = n$ and $M_i \simeq N_{\sigma(i)}$ for some permutation $\sigma$ of $\{ 1, \dots, n \}$. More precisely, since $N_1$ is indecomposable, $M = M_{i_1} \bigoplus (\bigoplus_{i=2}^n N_i)$ for some $i_1$. Then, since $N_2$ is indecomposable, $M = M_{i_1} \bigoplus M_{i_2} \bigoplus (\bigoplus_{i=3}^n N_i)$ and so on; i.e., complements to each sum $\bigoplus_{i=l}^n N_i$ can be taken to be direct sums of some $M_i$'s.

Another application is the following statement (which is a key step in the proof of Kaplansky's theorem on projective modules):

- Given an element $x \in N$, there exist a direct summand $H$ of $N$ and a subset $J \subset I$ such that $x \in H$ and $H \simeq \bigoplus_{j \in J} M_j$.

To see this, choose a finite set $F \subset I$ such that $x \in \bigoplus_{j \in F} M_j$. Then, writing $M = N \oplus L$, by Azumaya's theorem, $M = (\oplus_{j \in F} M_j) \oplus N_1 \oplus L_1$ with some direct summands $N_1, L_1$ of $N, L$ and then, by modular law, $N = H \oplus N_1$ with $H = (\oplus_{j \in F} M_j \oplus L_1) \cap N$. Then, since $L_1$ is a direct summand of $L$, we can write $L = L_1 \oplus L_1'$ and then $\oplus_{j \in F} M_j \simeq H \oplus L_1'$, which implies, since F is finite, that $H \simeq \oplus_{j \in J} M_j$ for some J by a repeated application of Azumaya's theorem.

In the setup of Azumaya's theorem, if, in addition, each $M_i$ is countably generated, then there is the following refinement (due originally to Crawley–Jónsson and later to Warfield): $N$ is isomorphic to $\bigoplus_{j \in J} M_j$ for some subset $J \subset I$. (In a sense, this is an extension of Kaplansky's theorem and is proved by the two lemmas used in the proof of the theorem.) According to (Facchini 1998), it is not known whether the assumption "$M_i$ countably generated" can be dropped; i.e., this refined version is true in general.

== Decomposition of a ring ==
On the decomposition of a ring, the most basic but still important observation, known as the Wedderburn-Artin theorem is this: given a ring R, the following are equivalent:

1. R is a semisimple ring; i.e., ${}_R R$ is a semisimple left module.
2. $R \cong \prod_{i=1}^r \operatorname{M}_{m_i}(D_i)$ for division rings $D_1, \dots, D_r$, where $\operatorname{M}_n(D_i)$ denotes the ring of n-by-n matrices with entries in $D_i$, and the positive integers $r$, the division rings $D_1, \dots , D_r$, and the positive integers $m_1, \dots, m_r$ are determined (the latter two up to permutation) by R
3. Every left module over R is semisimple.

To show 1. $\Rightarrow$ 2., first note that if $R$ is semisimple then we have an isomorphism of left $R$-modules ${}_R R \cong \bigoplus_{i=1}^r I_i^{\oplus m_i}$ where $I_i$ are mutually non-isomorphic minimal left ideals. Then, with the view that endomorphisms act from the right,

$$R \cong \operatorname{End}({}_R R) \cong \bigoplus_{i=1}^r \operatorname{End}(I_i^{\oplus m_i})$$

where each $\operatorname{End}(I_i^{\oplus m_i})$ can be viewed as the matrix ring over $D_i = \operatorname{End}(I_i)$, which is a division ring by Schur's Lemma. The converse holds because the decomposition of 2. is equivalent to a decomposition into minimal left ideals = simple left submodules. The equivalence 1. $\Leftrightarrow$ 3. holds because every module is a quotient of a free module, and a quotient of a semisimple module is semisimple.

== See also ==
- Pure-injective module
