= Kaplansky's theorem =

Kaplansky's theorem may refer to:

- Kaplansky's theorem on projective modules
- Kaplansky's theorem on quadratic forms
- Kaplansky density theorem
