= Simple module =

Type of module over a ring

In mathematics, specifically in ring theory, the simple modules over a ring R are the (left or right) modules over R that are non-zero and have no non-zero proper submodules. Equivalently, a module M is simple if and only if every cyclic submodule generated by a non-zero element of M equals M. Simple modules form building blocks for the modules of finite length, and they are analogous to the simple groups in group theory.

In this article, all modules will be assumed to be right unital modules over a ring R.

== Examples ==
Z-modules are the same as abelian groups, so a simple Z-module is an abelian group which has no non-zero proper subgroups. These are the cyclic groups of prime order.

If I is a right ideal of R, then I is simple as a right module if and only if I is a minimal non-zero right ideal: If M is a non-zero proper submodule of I, then it is also a right ideal, so I is not minimal. Conversely, if I is not minimal, then there is a non-zero right ideal J properly contained in I. J is a right submodule of I, so I is not simple.

If I is a right ideal of R, then the quotient module R/I is simple if and only if I is a maximal right ideal: If M is a non-zero proper submodule of R/I, then the preimage of M under the quotient map R → R/I is a right ideal which is not equal to R and which properly contains I. Therefore, I is not maximal. Conversely, if I is not maximal, then there is a right ideal J properly containing I. The quotient map R/I → R/J has a non-zero kernel which is not equal to R/I, and therefore R/I is not simple.

Every simple R-module is isomorphic to a quotient R/m where m is a maximal right ideal of R. By the above paragraph, any quotient R/m is a simple module. Conversely, suppose that M is a simple R-module. Then, for any non-zero element x of M, the cyclic submodule xR must equal M. Fix such an x. The statement that xR = M is equivalent to the surjectivity of the homomorphism R → M that sends r to xr. The kernel of this homomorphism is a right ideal I of R, and a standard theorem states that M is isomorphic to R/I. By the above paragraph, we find that I is a maximal right ideal. Therefore, M is isomorphic to a quotient of R by a maximal right ideal.

If k is a field and G is a group, then a group representation of G is a left module over the group ring k[G] (for details, see the main article on this relationship). The simple k[G]-modules are also known as irreducible representations. A major aim of representation theory is to understand the irreducible representations of groups.

== Basic properties of simple modules ==
The simple modules are precisely the modules of length 1; this is a reformulation of the definition.

Every simple module is indecomposable, but the converse is in general not true.

Every simple module is cyclic, that is it is generated by one element.

Not every module has a simple submodule; consider for instance the Z-module Z in light of the first example above.

Let M and N be (left or right) modules over the same ring, and let f : M → N be a module homomorphism. If M is simple, then f is either the zero homomorphism or injective because the kernel of f is a submodule of M. If N is simple, then f is either the zero homomorphism or surjective because the image of f is a submodule of N. If M = N, then f is an endomorphism of M, and if M is simple, then the prior two statements imply that f is either the zero homomorphism or an isomorphism. Consequently, the endomorphism ring of any simple module is a division ring. This result is known as Schur's lemma.

The converse of Schur's lemma is not true in general. For example, the Z-module Q is not simple, but its endomorphism ring is isomorphic to the field Q.

== Simple modules and composition series ==
If M is a module which has a non-zero proper submodule N, then there is a short exact sequence

$$0 \to N \to M \to M/N \to 0.$$

A common approach to proving a fact about M is to show that the fact is true for the center term of a short exact sequence when it is true for the left and right terms, then to prove the fact for N and M/N. If N has a non-zero proper submodule, then this process can be repeated. This produces a chain of submodules

$$\cdots \subset M_2 \subset M_1 \subset M.$$

In order to prove the fact this way, one needs conditions on this sequence and on the modules M_{i} /M_{i+1}. One particularly useful condition is that the length of the sequence is finite and each quotient module M_{i} /M_{i+1} is simple. In this case the sequence is called a composition series for M. In order to prove a statement inductively using composition series, the statement is first proved for simple modules, which form the base case of the induction, and then the statement is proved to remain true under an extension of a module by a simple module. For example, the Fitting lemma shows that the endomorphism ring of a finite length indecomposable module is a local ring, so that the strong Krull–Schmidt theorem holds and the category of finite length modules is a Krull-Schmidt category.

The Jordan–Hölder theorem and the Schreier refinement theorem describe the relationships amongst all composition series of a single module. The Grothendieck group ignores the order in a composition series and views every finite length module as a formal sum of simple modules. Over semisimple rings, this is no loss as every module is a semisimple module and so a direct sum of simple modules. Ordinary character theory provides better arithmetic control, and uses simple CG modules to understand the structure of finite groups G. Modular representation theory uses Brauer characters to view modules as formal sums of simple modules, but is also interested in how those simple modules are joined together within composition series. This is formalized by studying the Ext functor and describing the module category in various ways including quivers (whose nodes are the simple modules and whose edges are composition series of non-semisimple modules of length 2) and Auslander–Reiten theory where the associated graph has a vertex for every indecomposable module.

== The Jacobson density theorem ==
An important advance in the theory of simple modules was the Jacobson density theorem. The Jacobson density theorem states:

Let U be a simple right R-module and let D = End_{R}(U). Let A be any D-linear operator on U and let X be a finite D-linearly independent subset of U. Then there exists an element r of R such that x⋅A = x⋅r for all x in X.

In particular, any primitive ring may be viewed as (that is, isomorphic to) a ring of D-linear operators on some D-space.

A consequence of the Jacobson density theorem is Wedderburn's theorem; namely that any right Artinian simple ring is isomorphic to a full matrix ring of n-by-n matrices over a division ring for some n. This can also be established as a corollary of the Artin–Wedderburn theorem.

== See also ==
- Semisimple modules are modules that can be written as a sum of simple submodules
- Irreducible ideal
- Irreducible representation
