= Countably generated =

In mathematics, the term countably generated can have several meanings:

- An algebraic structure (group, module, algebra) having countably many generators, see generating set
- Countably generated space, a topological space in which the topology is determined by its countable subsets
- Countably generated module. (Kaplansky's theorem says that a projective module is a direct sum of countably generated modules.)
