= Invertible (disambiguation) =

Invertible may refer to

== Mathematics ==
- Invertible element
- Invertible function
- Invertible ideal
- Invertible knot
- Invertible jet
- Invertible matrix
- Invertible module
- Invertible sheaf

== Others ==
- Invertible counterpoint

== See also ==
- Inverse (disambiguation)
