= List of Japanese board games =

This is a list of board games invented or developed in Japan.

== Games ==
Game name	Year	Origin	Players	Gameplay style	Similar Games	Reference
Love Letter	2012	Kanai Factory	2–4	Risk and deduction game	Coup	
Gomoku (五目並べ, gomokunarabe)	circa 850	Traditional	2	Strategic abstract game played with Go pieces on a Renju board (15×15), goal to reach five in a row	Renju, Four in a row	
Jinsei Game (人生ゲーム, jin-sei gēmu)	1967	Takara	?	Japanese adaptation of The Game of Life	The Game of Life	
Machi Koro (街コロ)	2012	Grounding Inc.	2–5	Tabletop city-building/resource-gathering game using cards and dice	Catan	
Renju (連珠)	1899	Traditional	2	Strategic five-in-a-row game with equal chances for both players	Pente, Gomoku	
Riichi Mahjong (リーチ麻雀, Riichi Maajan)	1924	Traditional	4	Chinese Mahjong with Japanese rules	Mahjong	
Shadow Hunters (シャドウハンターズ, shadō hantāzu)	2005	Game Republic	4–8	Supernatural themed, strategic, secret team play	Bang!, Mafia	
Shogi and variants (将棋, shōgi; generals' chess) Japanese chess	16th Century	Traditional	2	Played on a 9×9 board; can use captured pieces against opponent	Chess	
Sugoroku (双六)	6th Century	Traditional	?	Race game, two variants	Backgammon (variant), Snakes and Ladders (variant)	
