= Principal indecomposable module =

In mathematics, especially in the area of abstract algebra known as module theory, a principal indecomposable module has many important relations to the study of a ring's modules, especially its simple modules, projective modules, and indecomposable modules.

== Definition ==
A (left) principal indecomposable module of a ring R is a (left) submodule of R that is a direct summand of R and is an indecomposable module. Alternatively, it is an indecomposable, projective, cyclic module. Principal indecomposable modules are also called PIMs for short.

== Relations ==
The projective indecomposable modules over some rings have very close connections with those rings' simple, projective, and indecomposable modules.

If the ring R is Artinian or even semiperfect, then R is a direct sum of principal indecomposable modules, and there is one isomorphism class of PIM per isomorphism class of simple module. To each PIM P is associated its head, P/JP, which is a simple module, being an indecomposable semi-simple module. To each simple module S is associated its projective cover P, which is a PIM, being an indecomposable, projective, cyclic module.

Similarly over a semiperfect ring, every indecomposable projective module is a PIM, and every finitely generated projective module is a direct sum of PIMs.

In the context of group algebras of finite groups over fields (which are semiperfect rings), the representation ring describes the indecomposable modules, and the modular characters of simple modules represent both a subring and a quotient ring. The representation ring over the complex field is usually better understood and since PIMs correspond to modules over the complexes using p-modular system, one can use PIMs to transfer information from the complex representation ring to the representation ring over a field of positive characteristic. Roughly speaking this is called block theory.

Over a Dedekind domain that is not a PID, the ideal class group measures the difference between projective indecomposable modules and principal indecomposable modules: the projective indecomposable modules are exactly the (modules isomorphic to) nonzero ideals and the principal indecomposable modules are precisely the (modules isomorphic to) nonzero principal ideals.
