= L-semi-inner product =

Generalization of inner products that applies to all normed spaces

In mathematics, there are two different notions of semi-inner-product. The first, and more common, is that of an inner product which is not required to be strictly positive. This article will deal with the second, called a L-semi-inner product or semi-inner product in the sense of Lumer, which is an inner product not required to be conjugate symmetric. It was formulated by Günter Lumer, for the purpose of extending Hilbert space type arguments to Banach spaces in functional analysis. Fundamental properties were later explored by Giles.

== Definition ==
We mention again that the definition presented here is different from that of the "semi-inner product" in standard functional analysis textbooks, where a "semi-inner product" satisfies all the properties of inner products (including conjugate symmetry) except that it is not required to be strictly positive.

A semi-inner-product, L-semi-inner product, or a semi-inner product in the sense of Lumer for a linear vector space $V$ over the field $\Complex$ of complex numbers is a function from $V \times V$ to $\Complex,$ usually denoted by $[\cdot,\cdot]$, such that for all $f, g, h \in V:$

1. Nonnegative-definiteness: $[f,f] \geq 0,$
2. Linearity in the 1st argument, meaning:
  1. Additivity in the 1st argument: $[f+g,h] = [f,h] + [g,h],$
  2. Homogeneity in the 1st argument: $[s f,g] = s [f,g] \quad \text{ for all } s \in \Complex,$
3. Conjugate homogeneity in the 2nd argument: $[f, s g] = \overline{s} [f,g] \quad \text{ for all } s \in \Complex,$
4. Cauchy–Schwarz inequality: $|[f,g]| \leq [f,f]^{1/2} [g,g]^{1/2}.$

== Difference from inner products ==
A semi-inner-product is different from inner products in that it is in general not conjugate symmetric, that is,
$$[f,g] \neq \overline{[g,f]}$$
generally. This is equivalent to saying that
$$[f,g+h] \neq [f,g] + [f,h]. \,$$

In other words, semi-inner-products are generally nonlinear about its second variable.

== Semi-inner-products for normed spaces ==
If $[\cdot,\cdot]$ is a semi-inner-product for a linear vector space $V$ then
$$\|f\| := [f,f]^{1/2},\quad f\in V$$
defines a norm on $V$.

Conversely, if $V$ is a normed vector space with the norm $\|\cdot\|$ then there always exists a (not necessarily unique) semi-inner-product on $V$ that is consistent with the norm on $V$ in the sense that
$$\|f\| = [f,f]^{1/2},\ \ \text{ for all } f \in V.$$

== Examples ==
The Euclidean space $\Complex^n$ with the $\ell^p$ norm ($1 \leq p<+\infty$)
$$\|x\|_p := \biggl(\sum_{j=1}^n |x_j|^p\biggr)^{1/p}$$
has the consistent semi-inner-product:
$$[x,y] := \frac{\sum_{j=1}^n x_j\overline{y_j}|y_j|^{p-2}}{\|y\|_p^{p-2}},\quad x,y \in \Complex^n\setminus\{0\},\ \ 1<p<+\infty,$$
$$[x,y] := \|y\|_1 \sum_{j=1}^nx_j\operatorname{sgn}(\overline{y_j}),\quad x,y \in \Complex^n,\ \ p=1,$$
where
$$\operatorname{sgn}(t):=\left\{
\begin{array}{ll}
\frac{t}{|t|},&t\in \Complex\setminus\{0\},\\
0,&t=0.
\end{array}
\right.$$

In general, the Lebesgue space $L^p(\Omega,d\mu)$ of $p$-integrable functions on a measure space $(\Omega,\mu),$ where $1 \leq p < +\infty,$ with the norm
$$\|f\|_p := \left(\int_\Omega |f(t)|^pd\mu(t)\right)^{1/p}$$
possesses the consistent semi-inner-product:
$$[f,g] := \frac{\int_\Omega f(t)\overline{g(t)}|g(t)|^{p-2}d\mu(t)}{\|g\|_p^{p-2}},\ \ f,g\in L^p(\Omega,d\mu)\setminus\{0\},\ \ 1<p<+\infty,$$
$$[f,g] := \int_\Omega f(t)\operatorname{sgn}(\overline{g(t)})d\mu(t),\ \ f,g\in L^1(\Omega,d\mu).$$

== Applications ==
1. Following the idea of Lumer, semi-inner-products were widely applied to study bounded linear operators on Banach spaces.
1. In 2007, Der and Lee applied semi-inner-products to develop large margin classification in Banach spaces.
2. In 2009–2011, semi-inner-products have been used as the main tool in establishing the concept of reproducing kernel Banach spaces for machine learning.
3. Semi-inner-products can also be used to establish the theory of frames, Riesz bases for Banach spaces.

== See also ==
- Additive map – Z-module homomorphism
- Cauchy's functional equation – Functional equation
