= Eben Matlis =

American mathematician (1923–2015)

Eben Matlis (August 28, 1923 - March 27, 2015) was a mathematician known for his contributions to the theory of rings and modules, especially for his work with injective modules over commutative Noetherian rings, and his introduction of Matlis duality.

Matlis earned his Ph.D. at the University of Chicago in 1958, with Irving Kaplansky as advisor. He is an emeritus professor at Northwestern University and was a member of the Institute for Advanced Study from August 1962 to June 1963.

== Selected works ==
- Matlis, Eben (1958), "Injective modules over Noetherian rings", Pacific Journal of Mathematics, 8 (3): 511–528, doi:10.2140/pjm.1958.8.511, ISSN 0030-8730, MR 0099360
- Matlis, Eben (1972), Torsion-free modules, University of Chicago Press, MR 0344237
- Matlis, Eben (1973), 1-dimensional Cohen-Macaulay rings, Lecture Notes in Mathematics, Vol. 327, Berlin, New York: Springer-Verlag, MR 0357391
