= Glossary of linear algebra =

This glossary of linear algebra is a list of definitions and terms relevant to the field of linear algebra, the branch of mathematics concerned with linear equations and their representations as vector spaces.

For a glossary related to the generalization of vector spaces through modules, see glossary of module theory.

== A ==
affine transformation
A composition of functions consisting of a linear transformation between vector spaces followed by a translation. Equivalently, a function between vector spaces that preserves affine combinations.
affine combination
A linear combination in which the sum of the coefficients is 1.

== B ==
basis
In a vector space, a linearly independent set of vectors spanning the whole vector space.
basis vector
An element of a given basis of a vector space.
bilinear form
On vector space V over field K, a bilinear form is a function $B : V \times V \to K$ that is linear in each variable.

== C ==
column vector
A matrix with only one column.
complex number
An element of a complex plane
complex plane
A linear algebra over the real numbers with basis {1, i }, where i is an imaginary unit
coordinate vector
The tuple of the coordinates of a vector on a basis.
covector
An element of the dual space of a vector space, (that is a linear form), identified to an element of the vector space through an inner product.

== D ==
determinant
The unique scalar function over square matrices which is distributive over matrix multiplication, multilinear in the rows and columns, and takes the value of $1$ for the identity matrix.
diagonal matrix
A matrix in which only the entries on the main diagonal are non-zero.
dimension
The number of elements of any basis of a vector space.
dot product
Given two vectors of the same length, the dot product is the sum of the products of their corresponding indices.
dual space
The vector space of all linear forms on a given vector space.

== E ==
elementary matrix
Square matrix that differs from the identity matrix by at most one entry

== H ==
hyperbolic unit
1. An operator (x, y) → (y, x), reflecting the plane in the 45° diagonal
2. In a linear algebra, a linear map which when composed with itself yields the identity

== I ==
identity matrix
A diagonal matrix all of the diagonal elements of which are equal to $1$.
imaginary unit
1. An operator (x, y) → (y, –x), rotating the plane 90° counterclockwise
2. In a linear algebra, a linear map which when composed with itself produces the negative of the identity
inverse matrix
Of a matrix $A$, another matrix $B$ such that $A$ multiplied by $B$ and $B$ multiplied by $A$ both equal the identity matrix.
isotropic vector
In a vector space with a quadratic form, a non-zero vector for which the form is zero.
isotropic quadratic form
A vector space with a quadratic form which has a null vector.

== L ==
linear algebra
1. The branch of mathematics that deals with vectors, vector spaces, linear transformations and systems of linear equations.
2. A vector space that has a binary operation making it a ring. This linear algebra is also known as an algebra over a field.
linear combination
A sum, each of whose summands is an appropriate vector times an appropriate scalar (or ring element).
linear dependence
A linear dependence of a tuple of vectors $\vec v_1,\ldots,\vec v_n$ is a nonzero tuple of scalar coefficients $c_1,\ldots,c_n$ for which the linear combination $c_1\vec v_1+\cdots+c_n\vec v_n$ equals $\vec0$.
linear equation
A polynomial equation of degree one (such as $x = 2y - 7$).
linear form
A linear map from a vector space to its field of scalars.
linear independence
Property of being not linearly dependent.
linear map
A function between vector spaces which respects addition and scalar multiplication.
linear transformation
A linear map whose domain and codomain are equal; it is generally supposed to be invertible.

== M ==
matrix
Rectangular arrangement of numbers or other mathematical objects. A matrix is written A = (a_{i, j}), where a_{i, j} is the entry at row i and column j.
matrix multiplication
If a matrix A has the same number of columns as does matrix B of rows, then a product C = AB may be formed with c_{i, j} equal to the dot product of row i of A with column j of B.

== N ==
null vector
1. Another term for an isotropic vector.
2. Another term for a zero vector.

== O ==
orthogonality
Two vectors u and v are orthogonal with respect to a bilinear form B when B(u,v) = 0.
orthonormality
A set of vectors is orthonormal when they are all unit vectors and are pairwise orthogonal.
orthogonal matrix
A real square matrix with rows (or columns) that form an orthonormal set.

== R ==
row vector
A matrix with only one row.

== S ==
scalar
A scalar is an element of a field used in the definition of a vector space.
singular-value decomposition
a factorization of an $m \times n$ complex matrix M as $\mathbf{U\Sigma V^*}$, where U is an $m \times m$ complex unitary matrix, $\mathbf{\Sigma}$ is an $m \times n$ rectangular diagonal matrix with non-negative real numbers on the diagonal, and V is an $n \times n$ complex unitary matrix.
spectrum
Set of the eigenvalues of a matrix.
split-complex number
An element of a split-complex plane.
split-complex plane
A linear algebra over the real numbers with basis {1, j }, where j is a hyperbolic unit.
square matrix
A matrix having the same number of rows as columns.

== T ==
transpose
The transpose of an n × m matrix M is an m × n matrix M ^{T} obtained by using the rows of M for the columns of M ^{T}.

== U ==
unit vector
a vector in a normed vector space whose norm is 1, or a Euclidean vector of length one.

== V ==
vector
1. A directed quantity, one with both magnitude and direction.
2. An element of a vector space.
vector space
A set, whose elements can be added together, and multiplied by elements of a field (this is scalar multiplication); the set must be an abelian group under addition, and the scalar multiplication must be a linear map.

== Z ==
zero vector
The additive identity in a vector space. In a normed vector space, it is the unique vector of norm zero. In a Euclidean vector space, it is the unique vector of length zero.
