= Erdős–Kaplansky theorem =

On the dimension of vector space duals

The Erdős–Kaplansky theorem is a theorem from linear algebra. The theorem makes a fundamental statement about the dimension of the dual spaces of infinite-dimensional vector spaces; in particular, it shows that the algebraic dual space is not isomorphic to the vector space itself. A more general formulation allows to compute the exact dimension of any function space.

The theorem is named after Paul Erdős and Irving Kaplansky.

== Statement ==
Let $E$ be an infinite-dimensional vector space over a field $\mathbb{K}$ and let $I$ be some basis of it. Then for the dual space $E^*$,

$$\operatorname{dim}(E^*)=\operatorname{card}(\mathbb{K}^I).$$

By Cantor's theorem, this cardinal is strictly larger than the dimension $\operatorname{card}(I)$ of $E$. More generally, if $I$ is an arbitrary infinite set, the dimension of the space of all functions $\mathbb{K}^I$ is given by:

$$\operatorname{dim}(\mathbb{K}^I)=\operatorname{card}(\mathbb{K}^I).$$

When $I$ is finite, it's a standard result that $\dim(\mathbb{K}^I) = \operatorname{card}(I)$. This gives us a full characterization of the dimension of this space.
