= Susanna S. Epp =

American mathematician (born 1943)

- Born: 1943
- Education: Northwestern University (BA); University of Chicago (MS, PhD)
- Awards: Louise Hay Award for Contributions to Mathematics Education (AWM Prizes)
- Scientific career
- Thesis: Submodules of Cayley Algebras (1971)
- Doctoral advisor: Irving Kaplansky
- Website: http://condor.depaul.edu/sepp/

Susanna Samuels Epp (born 1943) is an author, mathematician, and professor. Her interests include discrete mathematics, mathematical logic, cognitive psychology, and mathematics education, and she has written numerous articles, publications, and textbooks. She is currently professor emerita at DePaul University, where she chaired the Department of Mathematical Sciences and was Vincent de Paul Professor in Mathematics.

== Education and career ==
Epp holds degrees in mathematics from Northwestern University and the University of Chicago, where she completed her doctorate in 1968 under the supervision of Irving Kaplansky. She taught at Boston University and at the University of Illinois at Chicago before becoming a professor at DePaul University.

== Recognition ==
In 2005, she received the Louise Hay Award from the Association for Women in Mathematics in recognition for her contributions to mathematics education.

Her textbook Discrete Mathematics with Applications received a 2005 Textbook Excellence Award from the Textbook and Academic Authors Association.

== Selected publications ==
- Epp, Susanna S. (2020). Discrete mathematics with applications (Fifth ed.). Boston, MA. ISBN 978-1-337-69419-3. OCLC 1083530988.
- Epp, Susanna S. (2011). Discrete mathematics with applications (4th ed.). Boston, MA: Brooks/Cole. ISBN 978-0-495-39132-6. OCLC 496962601.
- Epp, S.S., Variables in Mathematics Education. In Tools for Teaching Logic. Blackburn, P., van Ditmarsch, H., et al., eds. Springer Publishing, 2011. (Reprinted in Best Writing on Mathematics 2012, M. Pitici, Ed. Princeton Univ. Press, Nov. 2012.)
- Epp, S.S., V. Durand-Guerrier, et al. Argumentation and proof in the mathematics classroom. In Proof and Proving in Mathematics Education, G. Hanna & M. de Villiers Eds. Springer Publishing. (co-authors: V. Durand-Guerrier, P. Boero, N. Douek, D. Tanguay), 2012.
- Epp, S.S., V. Durand-Guerrier, et al. Examining the role of logic in teaching proof. In Proof and Proving in Mathematics Education, G. Hanna & M. de Villiers Eds. Springer Publishing, 2012.
- Epp, S.S., Proof Issues with Existential Quantification. In Proof and Proving in Mathematics Education: ICMI Study 19 Conference Proceedings, F. L. Lin et al. eds., National Taiwan Normal University, 2009.
- Epp, S.S., The Use of Logic in Teaching Proof. In Resources for Teaching Discrete Mathematics. B. Hopkins, ed. Washington, DC: Mathematical Association of America, 2009, pp. 313–322.
- Epp, S.S., The Role of Logic in Teaching Proof, American Mathematical Monthly (110)10, Dec. 2003, 886-899
- Epp, S.S., The Language of Quantification in Mathematics Instruction. In Developing Mathematical Reasoning in Grades K-12. Lee V. Stiff, Ed. Reston, VA: NCTM Publications, 1999, 188-197.
- Epp, S.S., The Role of Proof in Problem Solving. In Mathematical Thinking and Problem Solving. Alan H. Schoenfeld, Ed. Hillsdale, NJ: Lawrence Erlbaum Associates, Inc., Publishers, 1994, 257-269.
