= Fitting lemma =

In mathematics, the Fitting lemma – named after the mathematician Hans Fitting – is a basic statement in abstract algebra. Suppose M is a module over some ring. If M is indecomposable and has finite length, then every endomorphism of M is either an automorphism or nilpotent.

As an immediate consequence, we see that the endomorphism ring of every finite-length indecomposable module is local.

A version of Fitting's lemma is often used in the representation theory of groups. This is in fact a special case of the version above, since every K-linear representation of a group G can be viewed as a module over the group algebra KG.

== Proof ==
To prove Fitting's lemma, we take an endomorphism f of M and consider the following two chains of submodules:

- The first is the descending chain $\mathrm{im}(f) \supseteq \mathrm{im}(f^2) \supseteq \mathrm{im}(f^3) \supseteq \ldots$,
- the second is the ascending chain $\mathrm{ker}(f) \subseteq \mathrm{ker}(f^2) \subseteq \mathrm{ker}(f^3) \subseteq \ldots$

Because $M$ has finite length, both of these chains must eventually stabilize, so there is some $n$ with $\mathrm{im}(f^n) = \mathrm{im}(f^{n'})$ for all $n' \geq n$, and some $m$ with $\mathrm{ker}(f^m) = \mathrm{ker}(f^{m'})$ for all $m' \geq m.$

Let now $k = \max\{n, m\}$, and note that by construction $\mathrm{im}(f^{2k}) = \mathrm{im}(f^{k})$ and $\mathrm{ker}(f^{2k}) = \mathrm{ker}(f^{k}).$

We claim that $\mathrm{ker}(f^k) \cap \mathrm{im}(f^k) = 0$. Indeed, every $x \in \mathrm{ker}(f^k) \cap \mathrm{im}(f^k)$ satisfies $x=f^k(y)$ for some $y \in M$ but also $f^k(x)=0$, so that $0=f^k(x)=f^k(f^k(y))=f^{2k}(y)$, therefore $y \in \mathrm{ker}(f^{2k}) = \mathrm{ker}(f^k)$ and thus $x=f^k(y)=0.$

Moreover, $\mathrm{ker}(f^k) + \mathrm{im}(f^k) = M$: for every $x \in M$, there exists some $y \in M$ such that $f^k(x)=f^{2k}(y)$ (since $f^k(x) \in \mathrm{im}(f^k) = \mathrm{im}(f^{2k})$), and thus $f^k(x-f^k(y)) = f^k(x)-f^{2k}(y)=0$, so that $x-f^k(y) \in \mathrm{ker}(f^k)$ and thus $x \in \mathrm{ker}(f^k)+f^k(y) \subseteq \mathrm{ker}(f^k) + \mathrm{im}(f^k).$

Consequently, $M$ is the direct sum of $\mathrm{im}(f^k)$ and $\mathrm{ker}(f^k)$. (This statement is also known as the Fitting decomposition theorem.) Because $M$ is indecomposable, one of those two summands must be equal to $M$ and the other must be the zero submodule. Depending on which of the two summands is zero, we find that $f$ is either bijective or nilpotent.
