= Additive map =

Z-module homomorphism

In algebra, an additive map or additive function is a function $f$ that preserves the addition operation:
$$f(x + y) = f(x) + f(y)$$
for every pair of elements $x$ and $y$ in the domain of $f$. For example, any linear map is additive. When the domain is the integers (ℤ), this is called a $\Z$-linear map. When the domain is the real numbers, this is Cauchy's functional equation. For a specific case of this definition, see additive polynomial.

More formally, an additive map is a $\Z$-module homomorphism. Since an abelian group is a $\Z$-module, it may be defined as a group homomorphism between abelian groups.

A map $V \times W \to X$ that is additive in each of two arguments separately is called a bi-additive map or a $\Z$-bilinear map.

== Examples ==
Typical examples include maps between rings, vector spaces, or modules that preserve the additive group. An additive map does not necessarily preserve any other structure of the object; for example, the product operation of a ring.

If $f$ and $g$ are additive maps, then the map $f + g$ (defined pointwise) is additive.

== Properties ==
Definition of scalar multiplication by an integer

Suppose that $X$ is an additive group with identity element $0$ and that the inverse of $x \in X$ is denoted by $-x$. For any $x \in X$ and integer $n \in \Z$, let:
$$n x := \left\{
\begin{alignat}{9}
&   &&0  &&             &&   &&~~~~              &&                   &&~\text{ when } n = 0 \\
&   &&x  &&+ \cdots +   &&x  &&~~~~ \text{(} n   &&\text{ summands) } &&~\text{ when } n > 0 \\
& (-&&x) &&+ \cdots + (-&&x) &&~~~~ \text{(} |n| &&\text{ summands) } &&~\text{ when } n < 0. \\
\end{alignat}
\right.$$
Thus $(-1) x = - x$ and it can be shown that for all integers $m, n \in \Z$ and all $x \in X$, $(m + n) x = m x + n x$ and $- (n x) = (-n) x = n (-x)$. This definition of scalar multiplication makes the cyclic subgroup $\Z x$ of $X$ into a left $\Z$-module; if $X$ is commutative, then it also makes $X$ into a left $\Z$-module.

Homogeneity over the integers

If $f : X \to Y$ is an additive map between additive groups then $f(0) = 0$ and for all $x \in X$, $f(-x) = - f(x)$ (where negation denotes the additive inverse) and (Note: $f(0) = f(0 + 0) = f(0) + f(0)$ so adding $-f(0)$ to both sides proves that $f(0) = 0$. If $x \in X$ then $0 = f(0) = f(x + (-x)) = f(x) + f(-x)$ so that $f(-x) = - f(x)$ where, by definition, $(-1) f(x) := - f(x)$. Induction shows that if $n \in \N$ is positive then $f(n x) = n f(x)$ and that the additive inverse of $n f(x)$ is $n (-f(x))$, which implies that $f((-n) x) = f(n (-x)) = n f(-x) = n (- f(x)) = -(n f(x)) = (-n) f(x)$ (this shows that $f(n x) = n f(x)$ holds for $n < 0$). $\blacksquare$)
$$f(n x) = n f(x) \quad \text{ for all } n \in \Z.$$
Consequently, $f(x - y) = f(x) - f(y)$ for all $x, y \in X$ (where, by definition, $x - y := x + (-y)$).

In other words, every additive map is homogeneous over the integers. Consequently, every additive map between abelian groups is a homomorphism of $\Z$-modules.

Homomorphism of $\Q$-modules

If the additive abelian groups $X$ and $Y$ are also a unital modules over the rationals $\Q$ (such as real or complex vector spaces) then an additive map $f : X \to Y$ satisfies: (Note: Let $x \in X$ and $q = \frac{m}{n} \in \Q$ where $m, n \in \Z$ and $n > 0$. Let $y := \frac{1}{n} x$. Then $n y = n \left(\frac{1}{n} x\right) = \left(n \frac{1}{n}\right) x = (1) x = x$, which implies $f(x) = f(n y) = n f(y) = n f\left(\frac{1}{n} x\right)$ so that multiplying both sides by $\frac{1}{n}$ proves that $f\left(\frac{1}{n} x\right) = \frac{1}{n} f(x)$. Consequently, $f(q x) = f\left(\frac{m}{n} x\right) = m f\left(\frac{1}{n} x\right) = m\left(\frac{1}{n} f(x)\right) = q f(x)$. $\blacksquare$)
$$f(q x) = q f(x) \quad \text{ for all } q \in \Q \text{ and } x \in X.$$
In other words, every additive map is homogeneous over the rational numbers. Consequently, every additive maps between unital $\Q$-modules is a homomorphism of $\Q$-modules.

Despite being homogeneous over $\Q$, as described in the article on Cauchy's functional equation, even when $X = Y = \R$, it is nevertheless still possible for the additive function $f : \R \to \R$ to not be homogeneous over the real numbers; said differently, there exist additive maps $f : \R \to \R$ that are not of the form $f(x) = s_0 x$ for some constant $s_0 \in \R$. In particular, there exist additive maps that are not linear maps with respect to an existing ring structure of the codomain.

== See also ==
- Antilinear map – Conjugate homogeneous additive map

== Notes ==
Proofs
