= Günter Lumer =

German-born mathematician (1929–2005)

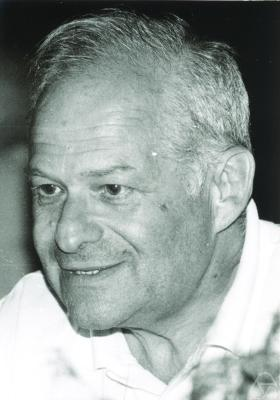
- Günter Lumer in Prague, 1987
- Born: May 29, 1929; Frankfurt, Germany
- Died: 2005 (aged 75–76)
- Education: University of Chicago; Universidad de la Republica
- Scientific career
- Fields: Mathematics
- Workplaces: University of Washington; University of Mons-Hainaut
- Doctoral advisor: Irving Kaplansky

Günter Lumer (May 29, 1929 – 2005) was a German-born mathematician known for his work in functional analysis. He is the namesake of the Lumer–Phillips theorem on semigroups of operators on Banach spaces, and was the first to study L-semi-inner products. Born in Germany and raised in France and Uruguay, he spent his professional career in the United States and Belgium.

Lumer was born in Frankfurt, on May 29, 1929. His family fled the Nazis in 1933, moving to France and then again in 1941 to Uruguay, where he became a citizen. Lumer studied at the Universidad de la República, where he came under the influence of Paul Halmos; his first mathematics paper, published in 1953, was jointly authored by Halmos and Juan Jorge Schäffer. He completed a degree in electrical engineering at Montevideo in 1957, and traveled to Halmos' home institution, the University of Chicago, on a Guggenheim Fellowship. At Chicago, he completed a doctorate in 1959 under the supervision of Irving Kaplansky.

Following short-term positions at the University of California, Los Angeles and Stanford University, he joined the faculty at the University of Washington in 1961. He moved to the University of Mons-Hainaut in 1973, and then to the International Solvay Institutes for Physics and Chemistry in Brussels in 1999, where he remained until his death in 2005.
