= Joseph J. Rotman =

Mathematician (1934–2016)

Joseph Jonah Rotman (May 26, 1934 – October 16, 2016) was a professor of mathematics at the University of Illinois at Urbana–Champaign and also a published author of 10 textbooks.

Rotman was born in Chicago. He did his undergraduate and graduate work at the University of Chicago, where he received his doctorate in 1959 with a thesis in abelian groups written under the direction of Irving Kaplansky. In 1959 he moved to the University of Illinois at Urbana–Champaign, where he spent the rest of his mathematical career. Rotman retired from UIUC in 2004. His research interests lay in the area of algebra, involving abelian groups, modules, homological algebra, and combinatorics.

Rotman was the managing editor of the Proceedings of the American Mathematical Society in 1972–1973. In 1985 he was the annual visiting lecturer of the South African Mathematical Society.

A partial list of Rotman's publications includes:

- An Introduction to Homological Algebra (1979), Pure and Applied Mathematics, vol. 85, Academic Press; ISBN 0-12-599250-5
- An Introduction to Algebraic Topology (1988), Springer-Verlag; ISBN 0-387-96678-1
- An Introduction to the Theory of Groups (1995), Springer-Verlag; ISBN 0-387-94285-8
- A First Course in Abstract Algebra (2000), Prentice Hall; ISBN 0-13-011584-3
- Advanced Modern Algebra (2002), Prentice Hall; ISBN 0-13-087868-5
- Journey into Mathematics: an introduction to proofs (2006), Dover Publications; ISBN 0-486-45306-5
