= Four-in-a-row =

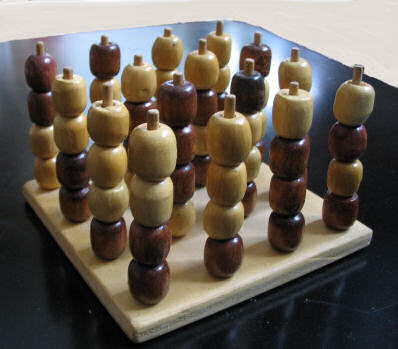
Qubic is an example of a four-in-a-row game

Four-in-a-row (or four-in-a-line, Yonmoku-Narabe) is the name for several games in which the object is to line up four things in a row. Some of these games are:

- Connect Four
- Score Four
- 3-D Tic-Tac-Toe
- Kaplansky's game
- Quarto
- Gobblet

== See also ==
- Pixel (board game): Four-in-a-row for 2 or 3 players, three-in-a-row for 4 players.
