= Kaplansky's game =

Abstract board game for two players

Kaplansky's game or Kaplansky's n-in-a-line is an abstract board game in which two players take turns in placing a stone of their color on an infinite lattice board, the winner being the player who first gets k stones of their own color on a line which does not have any stones of the opposite color on it. It is named after Irving Kaplansky.

== General results ==
- k ≤ 3 is a first-player win.
- 4 ≤ k ≤ 7 is believed to be draw, but this remains unproven.
- k ≥ 8 is a draw: Every player can draw via a "pairing strategy" or other "draw strategy" of m,n,k-game.

== See also ==
- m,n,k-game
- Hex (board game)
- Harary's generalized tictactoe
