= Kaplansky's theorem on quadratic forms =

Result on simultaneous representation of primes by quadratic forms

In mathematics, Kaplansky's theorem on quadratic forms is a result on simultaneous representation of primes by quadratic forms. It was proved in 2003 by Irving Kaplansky.

== Statement of the theorem ==
Kaplansky's theorem states that a prime p congruent to 1 modulo 16 is representable by both or none of x^{2} + 32y^{2} and x^{2} + 64y^{2}, whereas a prime p congruent to 9 modulo 16 is representable by exactly one of these quadratic forms.

This is remarkable since the primes represented by each of these forms individually are not describable by congruence conditions.

== Proof ==
Kaplansky's proof uses the facts that 2 is a 4th power modulo p if and only if p is representable by x^{2} + 64y^{2}, and that −4 is an 8th power modulo p if and only if p is representable by x^{2} + 32y^{2}.

== Examples ==
- The prime p = 17 is congruent to 1 modulo 16 and is representable by neither x^{2} + 32y^{2} nor x^{2} + 64y^{2}.
- The prime p = 113 is congruent to 1 modulo 16 and is representable by both x^{2} + 32y^{2} and x^{2}+64y^{2} (since 113 = 9^{2} + 32×1^{2} and 113 = 7^{2} + 64×1^{2}).
- The prime p = 41 is congruent to 9 modulo 16 and is representable by x^{2} + 32y^{2} (since 41 = 3^{2} + 32×1^{2}), but not by x^{2} + 64y^{2}.
- The prime p = 73 is congruent to 9 modulo 16 and is representable by x^{2} + 64y^{2} (since 73 = 3^{2} + 64×1^{2}), but not by x^{2} + 32y^{2}.

== Similar results ==
Five results similar to Kaplansky's theorem are known:

- A prime p congruent to 1 modulo 20 is representable by both or none of x^{2} + 20y^{2} and x^{2} + 100y^{2}, whereas a prime p congruent to 9 modulo 20 is representable by exactly one of these quadratic forms.
- A prime p congruent to 1, 16 or 22 modulo 39 is representable by both or none of x^{2} + xy + 10y^{2} and x^{2} + xy + 127y^{2}, whereas a prime p congruent to 4, 10 or 25 modulo 39 is representable by exactly one of these quadratic forms.
- A prime p congruent to 1, 16, 26, 31 or 36 modulo 55 is representable by both or none of x^{2} + xy + 14y^{2} and x^{2} + xy + 69y^{2}, whereas a prime p congruent to 4, 9, 14, 34 or 49 modulo 55 is representable by exactly one of these quadratic forms.
- A prime p congruent to 1, 65 or 81 modulo 112 is representable by both or none of x^{2} + 14y^{2} and x^{2} + 448y^{2}, whereas a prime p congruent to 9, 25 or 57 modulo 112 is representable by exactly one of these quadratic forms.
- A prime p congruent to 1 or 169 modulo 240 is representable by both or none of x^{2} + 150y^{2} and x^{2} + 960y^{2}, whereas a prime p congruent to 49 or 121 modulo 240 is representable by exactly one of these quadratic forms.

It is conjectured that there are no other similar results involving definite forms.
