= Irving Kaplansky =

Canadian mathematician (1917–2006)

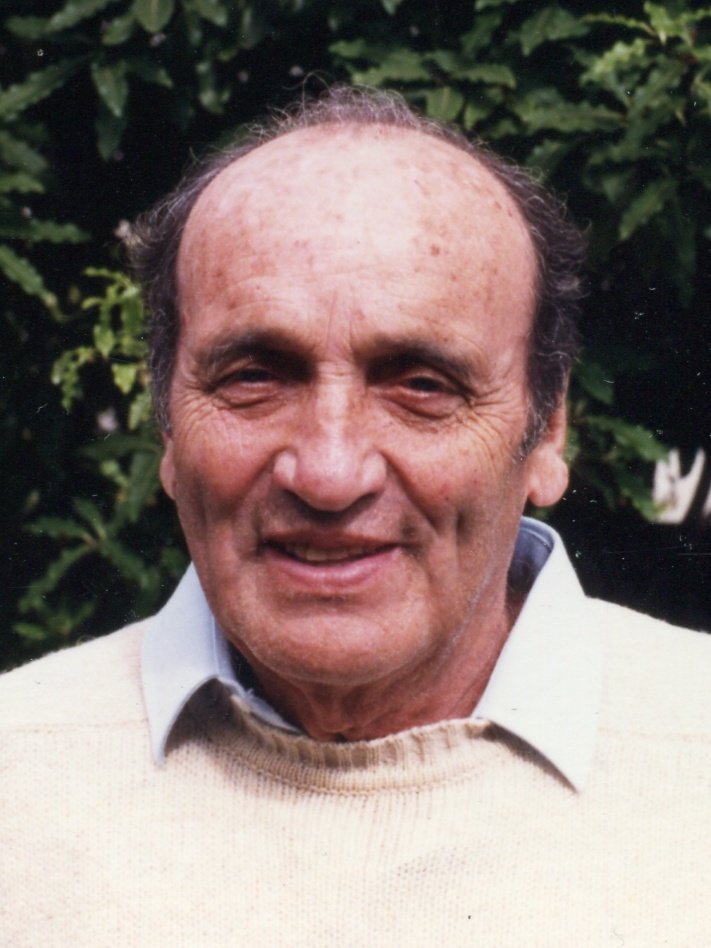
- Kaplansky in Berkeley, 1988
- Born: March 22, 1917; Toronto
- Died: June 25, 2006 (age 89); Los Angeles
- Education: University of Toronto; Harvard University
- Known for: Erdős–Kaplansky theorem Kaplansky density theorem Kaplansky's game Kaplansky's conjecture Kaplansky's theorem on quadratic forms Kaplansky's theorem on projective modules Group theory Hilbert space Ring theory Operator algebras Homological algebra Topological algebra Game theory Field theory
- Awards: William Lowell Putnam Mathematical Competition (1938); Guggenheim Fellowship (1948); Jeffery–Williams Prize (1968); Honorary member of the London Mathematical Society (1987); Leroy P. Steele Prize (1989)
- Scientific career
- Fields: Mathematics
- Workplaces: American Mathematical Society; Mathematical Sciences Research Institute; Institute for Advanced Study; University of Chicago; Columbia University; University of California, Berkeley
- Doctoral advisor: Saunders Mac Lane
- Doctoral students: Hyman Bass; Susanna S. Epp; Günter Lumer; Eben Matlis; Jacob Matijevic; Donald Ornstein; Ed Posner; Alex F. T. W. Rosenberg; Joseph J. Rotman; Judith D. Sally; Harold Widom

Irving Kaplansky (March 22, 1917 – June 25, 2006) was a mathematician, college professor, author, and amateur musician.

== Biography ==
Kaplansky, or "Kap" as his friends and colleagues called him, was born in Toronto, Ontario, Canada, to Polish-Jewish immigrants. His father worked as a tailor, and his mother ran a grocery and, eventually, a chain of bakeries. He went to Harbord Collegiate Institute receiving the Prince of Wales Scholarship as a teenager. He attended the University of Toronto as an undergraduate and finished first in his class for three consecutive years. In his senior year, he competed in the first William Lowell Putnam Mathematical Competition, becoming one of the first five recipients of the Putnam Fellowship, which paid for graduate studies at Harvard University. Administered by the Mathematical Association of America, the competition is widely considered to be the most difficult mathematics examination in the world and "its difficulty is such that the median score is often zero or one (out of 120) despite being attempted by students specializing in mathematics."

After receiving his Ph.D. from Harvard in 1941 as Saunders Mac Lane's first student, he remained at Harvard as a Benjamin Peirce Instructor, and in 1944 moved with Mac Lane to Columbia University for one year to collaborate on work surrounding World War II working on "miscellaneous studies in mathematics applied to warfare analysis with emphasis upon aerial gunnery, studies of fire control equipment, and rocketry and toss bombing" with the Applied Mathematics Panel. He was a member of the Institute for Advanced Study and attended the 1946 Princeton University Bicentennial.

He was professor of mathematics at the University of Chicago from 1945 to 1984, and chair of the department from 1962 to 1967. In 1968, Kaplansky was presented an honorary doctoral degree from Queen's University with the university noting "we honour as a Canadian whose clarity of lectures, elegance of writing, and profundity of research have won him widespread acclaim as the greatest mathematician this country has so far produced." From 1967 to 1969, Kaplansky wrote the mathematics section of Encyclopædia Britannica. Kaplansky was the director of the Mathematical Sciences Research Institute from 1984 to 1992, and the president of the American Mathematical Society from 1985 to 1986.

Kaplansky was also an accomplished amateur musician. He had perfect pitch, studied piano until the age of 15, earned money in high school as a dance band musician, taught Tom Lehrer, and played in Harvard's jazz band in graduate school. He also had a regular program on Harvard's student radio station. After moving to the University of Chicago, he stopped playing for two decades, but then returned to music as an accompanist for student-run Gilbert and Sullivan productions and as a calliope player in football game parades. He often composed music based on mathematical themes. One of those compositions, A Song About Pi, is a melody based on assigning notes to the first 14 decimal places of pi, and has occasionally been performed by his daughter, singer-songwriter Lucy Kaplansky.

== Mathematical contributions ==
Kaplansky made major contributions to group theory, ring theory, the theory of operator algebras and field theory and created the Kaplansky density theorem, Kaplansky's game and Kaplansky conjecture. He published more than 150 articles and 11 mathematical books.

Kaplansky was the doctoral supervisor of 55 students including notable mathematicians Hyman Bass, Susanna S. Epp, Günter Lumer, Eben Matlis, Donald Ornstein, Ed Posner, Alex F. T. W. Rosenberg, Judith D. Sally, and Harold Widom. He has over 950 academic descendants, including many through his academic grandchildren David J. Foulis (who studied with Kaplansky at the University of Chicago before completing his doctorate under the supervision of Kaplansky's student Fred Wright Jr.) and Carl Pearcy (the student of H. Arlen Brown, who had been jointly supervised by Kaplansky and Paul Halmos).

== Awards and honors ==
Kaplansky was a member of the National Academy of Sciences and the American Academy of Arts and Sciences, Director of the Mathematical Sciences Research Institute, and President of the American Mathematical Society. He was the plenary speaker at the British Mathematical Colloquium in 1966. Won the William Lowell Putnam Mathematical Competition, the Guggenheim Fellowship, the Jeffery–Williams Prize, and the Leroy P. Steele Prize. He received the Quantrell Award.

== Selected publications ==
=== Books ===
- Kaplansky, Irving (1954). Infinite Abelian groups. revised edn. 1971 with several later reprintings
- —— (1955). An introduction to differential algebra. University of Chicago Press. 2nd edn. Paris: Hermann. 1957.
- —— (1966). Introdução à teoria de Galois, por I. Kaplansky. Pref. de Elon Lages Lima.
- —— (1968). Rings of operators.
- —— (1969). Fields and rings. 2nd edn. 1972
- —— (1969). Linear algebra and geometry; a second course. revised edn. 1974
- —— (1970). Algebraic and analytic aspects of operator algebras. American Mathematical Soc. ISBN 9780821816509.
- —— (1971). Lie Algebras and Locally Compact Groups. University of Chicago Press. ISBN 0-226-42453-7. several later reprintings
- —— (1972). Set theory and metric spaces. 2nd edn. 1977
- —— (1974). Commutative Rings. Lectures in Mathematics. University of Chicago Press. ISBN 0-226-42454-5. 1st edn. 1966; revised 1974 with several later reprintings
- with I. N. Herstein: —— (1974). Matters mathematical. New York, Harper & Row. ISBN 9780060428037. 2nd edn. 1978
- —— (1995). Selected papers and other writings. Springer. ISBN 9780387944067.

=== Articles ===
- Kaplansky, Irving (1944). "Symbolic solution of certain problems in permutations". Bull. Amer. Math. Soc. 50 (12): 906–914. doi:10.1090/s0002-9904-1944-08261-x. MR 0011393.
- —— (1945). "A note on groups without isomorphic subgroups". Bull. Amer. Math. Soc. 51 (8): 529–530. doi:10.1090/s0002-9904-1945-08382-7. MR 0012267.
- with I. S. Cohen: Cohen, I. S.; Kaplansky, Irving (1946). "Rings with a finite number of primes. I". Trans. Amer. Math. Soc. 60: 468–477. doi:10.1090/s0002-9947-1946-0019595-7. MR 0019595.
- —— (1946). "On a problem of Kurosch and Jacobson". Bull. Amer. Math. Soc. 52 (6): 496–500. doi:10.1090/s0002-9904-1946-08600-0. MR 0016758.
- —— (1947). "Lattices of continuous functions". Bull. Amer. Math. Soc. 53 (6): 617–623. doi:10.1090/s0002-9904-1947-08856-x. MR 0020715.
- with Richard F. Arens: Arens, Richard F.; Kaplansky, Irving (1948). "Topological representations of algebras". Trans. Amer. Math. Soc. 63 (3): 457–481. doi:10.1090/s0002-9947-1948-0025453-6. MR 0025453.
- —— (1948). "Rings with a polynomial identity". Bull. Amer. Math. Soc. 54 (6): 575–580. doi:10.1090/s0002-9904-1948-09049-8. MR 0025451.
- "Topological rings". Bull. Amer. Math. Soc. 54: 909–916. 1948. doi:10.1090/S0002-9904-1948-09096-6. MR 0027269.
- —— (1949). "Elementary divisors and modules". Trans. Amer. Math. Soc. 66 (2): 464–491. doi:10.1090/s0002-9947-1949-0031470-3. MR 0031470.
- —— (1949). "Primary ideals in group algebras". Proc Natl Acad Sci U S A. 35 (3): 133–136. Bibcode:1949PNAS...35..133K. doi:10.1073/pnas.35.3.133. PMC 1062983. PMID 16588871.
- —— (1950). "Topological representations of algebras. II". Trans. Amer. Math. Soc. 68: 62–75. doi:10.1090/s0002-9947-1950-0032612-4. MR 0032612.
- —— (1950). "The Weierstrass theorem in fields with valuations". Proc. Amer. Math. Soc. 1 (3): 356–357. doi:10.1090/s0002-9939-1950-0035760-3. MR 0035760.
- —— (1951). "The structure of certain operator algebras". Trans. Amer. Math. Soc. 70 (2): 219–255. doi:10.1090/s0002-9947-1951-0042066-0. MR 0042066.
- —— (1952). "Modules over Dedekind rings and valuations rings". Trans. Amer. Math. Soc. 72 (2): 327–340. doi:10.1090/s0002-9947-1952-0046349-0. MR 0046349.
- —— (1952). "Orthogonal similarity in infinite dimensional spaces". Proc. Amer. Math. Soc. 3: 16–25. doi:10.1090/s0002-9939-1952-0046564-1. MR 0046564.
- —— (1952). "Symmetry of Banach algebras". Proc. Amer. Math. Soc. 3 (3): 396–399. doi:10.1090/s0002-9939-1952-0048711-4. MR 0048711.
- —— (1952). "Some results on abelian groups". Proc Natl Acad Sci U S A. 38 (6): 538–540. Bibcode:1952PNAS...38..538K. doi:10.1073/pnas.38.6.538. PMC 1063607. PMID 16589142.
- —— (1953). "Infinite dimensional quadratic forms admitting composition". Proc. Amer. Math. Soc. 4 (6): 956–960. doi:10.1090/s0002-9939-1953-0059895-7. MR 0059895.
- —— (1953). "Dual modules over a valuation ring. I". Proc. Amer. Math. Soc. 4 (2): 213–219. doi:10.1090/s0002-9939-1953-0053092-7. MR 0053092.
- —— (1958). "Lie algebras of characteristic p". Trans. Amer. Math. Soc. 89: 149–183. doi:10.1090/s0002-9947-1958-0099359-7. MR 0099359.
- —— (1962). "Decomposability of modules". Proc. Amer. Math. Soc. 13 (4): 532–535. doi:10.1090/s0002-9939-1962-0137738-6. MR 0137738.
- —— (1980). "Superalgebras". Pacific J. Math. 86 (1): 93–98. doi:10.2140/pjm.1980.86.93.
- —— (1994). "A quasi-commutative ring that is not neo-commutative". Proc. Amer. Math. Soc. 122: 321. doi:10.1090/s0002-9939-1994-1257114-3. MR 1257114.
- "The forms x+32y^{2} and x+64y^{2}". Proc. Amer. Math. Soc. 131: 2299–2300. 2003. doi:10.1090/s0002-9939-03-07022-9. MR 1963780.

== See also ==
- Kaplansky's theorem on projective modules
