= Kaplansky density theorem =

In the theory of von Neumann algebras, the Kaplansky density theorem, due to Irving Kaplansky, is a fundamental approximation theorem. The importance and ubiquity of this technical tool led Gert Pedersen to comment in one of his books that,

The density theorem is Kaplansky's great gift to mankind. It can be used every day, and twice on Sundays.

== Formal statement ==
Let K^{−} denote the strong-operator closure of a set K in B(H), the set of bounded operators on the Hilbert space H, and let (K)_{1} denote the intersection of K with the unit ball of B(H).

Kaplansky density theorem. If $A$ is a self-adjoint algebra of operators in $B(H)$, then each element $a$ in the unit ball of the strong-operator closure of $A$ is in the strong-operator closure of the unit ball of $A$. In other words, $(A)_1^{-} = (A^{-})_1$. If $h$ is a self-adjoint operator in $(A^{-})_1$, then $h$ is in the strong-operator closure of the set of self-adjoint operators in $(A)_1$.

The Kaplansky density theorem can be used to formulate some approximations with respect to the strong operator topology.

1) If h is a positive operator in (A^{−})_{1}, then h is in the strong-operator closure of the set of self-adjoint operators in (A^{+})_{1}, where A^{+} denotes the set of positive operators in A.

2) If A is a C*-algebra acting on the Hilbert space H and u is a unitary operator in A^{−}, then u is in the strong-operator closure of the set of unitary operators in A.

In the density theorem and 1) above, the results also hold if one considers a ball of radius r > 0, instead of the unit ball.

== Proof ==
The standard proof uses the fact that a bounded continuous real-valued function f is strong-operator continuous. In other words, for a net {a_{α}} of self-adjoint operators in A, the continuous functional calculus a → f(a) satisfies,

$$\lim f(a_{\alpha}) = f (\lim a_{\alpha})$$

in the strong operator topology. This shows that self-adjoint part of the unit ball in A^{−} can be approximated strongly by self-adjoint elements in A. A matrix computation in M_{2}(A) considering the self-adjoint operator with entries 0 on the diagonal and a and a^{*} at the other positions, then removes the self-adjointness restriction and proves the theorem.

== See also ==
- Jacobson density theorem
- Von Neumann bicommutant theorem
