= Generating set of a module =

Concept in mathematics

In mathematics, a generating set Γ of a module M over a ring R is a subset of M such that the smallest submodule of M containing Γ is M itself (the smallest submodule containing a subset is the intersection of all submodules containing the set). The set Γ is then said to generate M. For example, the ring R is generated by the identity element 1 as a left R-module over itself. If there is a finite generating set, then a module is said to be finitely generated.

This applies to ideals, which are the submodules of the ring itself. In particular, a principal ideal is an ideal that has a generating set consisting of a single element.

Explicitly, if Γ is a generating set of a module M, then every element of M is a (finite) R-linear combination of some elements of Γ; i.e., for each x in M, there are r_{1}, ..., r_{m} in R and g_{1}, ..., g_{m} in Γ such that

$$x = r_1 g_1 + \cdots + r_m g_m.$$

Put in another way, there is a surjection

$$\bigoplus_{g \in \Gamma} R \to M, \, r_g \mapsto r_g g,$$

where we wrote r_{g} for an element in the g-th component of the direct sum. (Coincidentally, since a generating set always exists, e.g. M itself, this shows that a module is a quotient of a free module, a useful fact.)

A generating set of a module is said to be minimal if no proper subset of the set generates the module. If R is a field, then a minimal generating set is the same thing as a basis. Unless the module is finitely generated, there may exist no minimal generating set.

The cardinality of a minimal generating set need not be an invariant of the module; Z is generated as a principal ideal by 1, but it is also generated by, say, a minimal generating set {2, 3}. What is uniquely determined by a module is the infimum of the numbers of the generators of the module.

Let R be a local ring with maximal ideal m and residue field k and M finitely generated module. Then Nakayama's lemma says that M has a minimal generating set whose cardinality is $\dim_k M / mM = \dim_k M \otimes_R k$. If M is flat, then this minimal generating set is linearly independent (so M is free). See also: Minimal resolution.

A more refined information is obtained if one considers the relations between the generators; see Free presentation of a module.

== See also ==
- Countably generated module
- Flat module
- Invariant basis number
