= Free presentation =

In algebra, a module over a ring

In algebra, a free presentation of a module M over a commutative ring R is an exact sequence of R-modules:

$$\bigoplus_{i \in I} R \ \overset{f} \to\ \bigoplus_{j \in J} R \ \overset{g}\to\ M \to 0.$$

Note the image under g of the standard basis generates M. In particular, if J is finite, then M is a finitely generated module. If I and J are finite sets, then the presentation is called a finite presentation; a module is called finitely presented if it admits a finite presentation.

Since f is a module homomorphism between free modules, it can be visualized as an (infinite) matrix with entries in R and M as its cokernel.

A free presentation always exists: any module is a quotient of a free module: $F \ \overset{g}\to\ M \to 0$, but then the kernel of g is again a quotient of a free module: $F' \ \overset{f} \to\ \ker g \to 0$. The combination of f and g is a free presentation of M. Now, one can obviously keep "resolving" the kernels in this fashion; the result is called a free resolution. Thus, a free presentation is the early part of the free resolution.

A presentation is useful for computation. For example, since tensoring is right-exact, tensoring the above presentation with a module, say N, gives:

$$\bigoplus_{i \in I} N \ \overset{f \otimes 1} \to\ \bigoplus_{j \in J} N \to M \otimes_R N \to 0.$$

This says that $M \otimes_R N$ is the cokernel of $f \otimes 1$. If N is also a ring (and hence an R-algebra), then this is the presentation of the N-module $M \otimes_R N$; that is, the presentation extends under base extension.

For left-exact functors, there is for example

Proposition—Let F, G be left-exact contravariant functors from the category of modules over a commutative ring R to abelian groups and θ a natural transformation from F to G. If $\theta: F(R^{\oplus n}) \to G(R^{\oplus n})$ is an isomorphism for each natural number n, then $\theta: F(M) \to G(M)$ is an isomorphism for any finitely-presented module M.

Proof: Applying F to a finite presentation $R^{\oplus n} \to R^{\oplus m} \to M \to 0$ results in

$$0 \to F(M) \to F(R^{\oplus m}) \to F(R^{\oplus n}).$$

This can be trivially extended to

$$0 \to 0 \to F(M) \to F(R^{\oplus m}) \to F(R^{\oplus n}).$$

The same thing holds for $G$. Now apply the five lemma. $\square$

== See also ==
- Coherent module
- Finitely related module
- Fitting ideal
- Quasi-coherent sheaf
