= Invertible module =

In mathematics, particularly commutative algebra, an invertible module is intuitively a module that has an inverse with respect to the tensor product. Invertible modules form the foundation for the definition of invertible sheaves in algebraic geometry.

Formally, a finitely generated module M over a ring R is said to be invertible if it is locally a free module of rank 1. In other words, $M_P\cong R_P$ for all primes P of R. Now, if M is an invertible R-module, then its dual M^{*} = Hom(M,R) is its inverse with respect to the tensor product, i.e. $M\otimes _R M^*\cong R$.

The theory of invertible modules is closely related to the theory of codimension one varieties including the theory of divisors.

== See also ==
- Picard group
