= Countably generated module =

Module generated by a countable subset

In mathematics, a module over a (not necessarily commutative) ring is countably generated if it is generated as a module by a countable subset. The importance of the notion comes from Kaplansky's theorem (Kaplansky 1958), which states that a projective module is a direct sum of countably generated modules.

More generally, a module over a possibly non-commutative ring is projective if and only if (i) it is flat, (ii) it is a direct sum of countably generated modules and (iii) it is a Mittag-Leffler module. (Bazzoni–Stovicek)
