= Free module =

In mathematics, a module that has a basis

In mathematics, a free module is a module that has a basis, that is, a generating set that is linearly independent. Every vector space is a free module, but, if the ring of the coefficients is not a division ring (not a field in the commutative case), then there exist non-free modules.

Given any set S and ring R, there is a free R-module with basis S, which is called the free module on S or module of formal R-linear combinations of the elements of S.

A free abelian group is precisely a free module over the ring $\Z$ of integers.

== Definition ==
For a ring $R$ and an $R$-module $M$, the set $E\subseteq M$ is a basis for $M$ if:

- $E$ is a generating set for $M$; that is to say, every element of $M$ is a finite sum of elements of $E$ multiplied by coefficients in $R$; and
- $E$ is linearly independent: for every set $\{e_1,\dots,e_n\}\subset E$ of distinct elements, $r_1 e_1 + r_2 e_2 + \cdots + r_n e_n = 0_M$ implies that $r_1 = r_2 = \cdots = r_n = 0_R$ (where $0_M$ is the zero element of $M$ and $0_R$ is the zero element of $R$).

A free module is a module with a basis.

An immediate consequence of the second half of the definition is that the coefficients in the first half are unique for each element of M.

If $R$ has invariant basis number, then by definition any two bases have the same cardinality. For example, nonzero commutative rings have invariant basis number. The cardinality of any (and therefore every) basis is called the rank of the free module $M$. If this cardinality is finite, the free module is said to be free of finite rank, or free of rank n if the rank is known to be n.

== Examples ==
Let R be a ring.

- R is a free module of rank one over itself (either as a left or right module); any unit element is a basis.
- More generally, If R is commutative, a nonzero ideal I of R is free if and only if it is a principal ideal generated by a nonzerodivisor, with a generator being a basis.
- Over a principal ideal domain (e.g., $\mathbb{Z}$), a submodule of a free module is free.
- If R is commutative, the polynomial ring $R[X]$ in indeterminate X is a free module with a possible basis 1, X, X^{2}, ....
- Let $A[t]$ be a polynomial ring over a commutative ring A, f a monic polynomial of degree d there, $B = A[t]/(f)$ and $\xi$ the image of t in B. Then B contains A as a subring and is free as an A-module with a basis $1, \xi, \dots, \xi^{d-1}$.
- For any non-negative integer n, $R^n = R \times \cdots \times R$, the cartesian product of n copies of R as a left R-module, is free. If R has invariant basis number, then its rank is n.
- A direct sum of free modules is free, while an infinite cartesian product of free modules is generally not free (cf. the Baer–Specker group).
- A finitely generated module over a commutative local ring is free if and only if it is faithfully flat. Also, Kaplansky's theorem states a projective module over a (possibly non-commutative) local ring is free.
- Sometimes, whether a module is free or not is undecidable in the set-theoretic sense. A famous example is the Whitehead problem, which asks whether a Whitehead group is free or not. As it turns out, the problem is independent of ZFC.

== Formal linear combinations ==
Given a set E and ring R, there is a free R-module that has E as a basis: namely, the direct sum of copies of R indexed by E

$$R^{(E)} = \bigoplus_{e \in E} R.$$

Explicitly, it is the submodule of the Cartesian product $\prod_E R$ (R is viewed as say a left module) that consists of the elements that have only finitely many nonzero components. One can embed E into R^{(E)} as a subset by identifying an element e with that of R^{(E)} whose e-th component is 1 (the unity of R) and all the other components are zero. Then each element of R^{(E)} can be written uniquely as

$$\sum_{e \in E} c_e e ,$$

where only finitely many $c_e$ are nonzero. It is called a formal linear combination of elements of E.

A similar argument shows that every free left (resp. right) R-module is isomorphic to a direct sum of copies of R as left (resp. right) module.

=== Another construction ===
The free module R^{(E)} may also be constructed in the following equivalent way.

Given a ring R and a set E, first as a set we let

$$R^{(E)} = \{ f: E \to R \mid f(x) = 0 \text { for all but finitely many } x \in E \}.$$

We equip it with a structure of a left module such that the addition is defined by: for x in E,

$$(f+g)(x) = f(x) + g(x)$$

and the scalar multiplication by: for r in R and x in E,

$$(r f)(x) = r f(x)$$

Now, as an R-valued function on E, each f in $R^{(E)}$ can be written uniquely as

$$f = \sum_{e \in E} c_e \delta_e$$

where $c_e$ are in R and only finitely many of them are nonzero and $\delta_e$ is given as

$$\delta_e(x) = \begin{cases} 1_R \quad\mbox{if } x=e \\ 0_R \quad\mbox{if } x\neq e \end{cases}$$

(this is a variant of the Kronecker delta). The above means that the subset $\{ \delta_e \mid e \in E \}$ of $R^{(E)}$ is a basis of $R^{(E)}$. The mapping $e \mapsto \delta_e$ is a bijection between E and this basis. Through this bijection, $R^{(E)}$ is a free module with the basis E.

== Universal property ==
The inclusion mapping $\iota : E\to R^{(E)}$ defined above is universal in the following sense. Given an arbitrary function $f : E\to N$ from a set E to a left R-module N, there exists a unique module homomorphism $\overline{f}: R^{(E)}\to N$ such that $f = \overline{f} \circ\iota$; namely, $\overline{f}$ is defined by the formula:

$$\overline{f}\left (\sum_{e \in E} r_e e \right) = \sum_{e \in E} r_e f(e)$$

and $\overline{f}$ is said to be obtained by extending $f$ by linearity. The uniqueness means that each R-linear map $R^{(E)} \to N$ is uniquely determined by its restriction to E.

As usual for universal properties, this defines R^{(E)} up to a canonical isomorphism. Also the formation of $\iota : E\to R^{(E)}$ for each set E determines a functor

$$R^{(-)}: \textbf{Set} \to R\text{-}\mathsf{Mod}, \, E \mapsto R^{(E)}$$,

from the category of sets to the category of left R-modules. It is called the free functor and satisfies a natural relation: for each set E and a left module N,

$$\operatorname{Hom}_{\textbf{Set}}(E, U(N)) \simeq \operatorname{Hom}_R(R^{(E)}, N), \, f \mapsto \overline{f}$$

where $U: R\text{-}\mathsf{Mod} \to \textbf{Set}$ is the forgetful functor, meaning $R^{(-)}$ is a left adjoint of the forgetful functor.

== Generalizations ==
Many statements true for free modules extend to certain larger classes of modules. Projective modules are direct summands of free modules. Flat modules are defined by the property that tensoring with them preserves exact sequences. Torsion-free modules form an even broader class. For a finitely generated module over a PID (such as Z), the properties free, projective, flat, and torsion-free are equivalent.

See local ring, perfect ring and Dedekind ring.

== See also ==
- Free object
- Free presentation
- Free resolution
- Quillen–Suslin theorem
- Stably free module
- Generic freeness
