= Kaplansky's theorem on projective modules =

In abstract algebra, Kaplansky's theorem on projective modules, first proven by Irving Kaplansky, states that a projective module over a local ring is free; where a not-necessarily-commutative ring is called local if for each element x, either x or 1 − x is a unit element. The theorem can also be formulated so to characterize a local ring (#Characterization of a local ring).

For a finitely generated projective module over a commutative local ring, the theorem is an easy consequence of Nakayama's lemma. For the general case, the proof (both the original as well as later one) consists of the following two steps:

- Observe that a projective module over an arbitrary ring is a direct sum of countably generated projective modules.
- Show that a countably generated projective module over a local ring is free (by a "[reminiscence] of the proof of Nakayama's lemma").

The idea of the proof of the theorem was also later used by Hyman Bass to show big projective modules (under some mild conditions) are free. According to (Anderson & Fuller 1992), Kaplansky's theorem "is very likely the inspiration for a major portion of the results" in the theory of semiperfect rings.

== Proof ==
The proof of the theorem is based on two lemmas, both of which concern decompositions of modules and are of independent general interest.

Lemma 1— Let $\mathfrak{F}$ denote the family of modules that are direct sums of some countably generated submodules (here modules can be those over a ring, a group or even a set of endomorphisms). If $M$ is in $\mathfrak{F}$, then each direct summand of $M$ is also in $\mathfrak{F}$.

Proof: Let N be a direct summand; i.e., $M = N \oplus L$. Using the assumption, we write $M = \bigoplus_{i \in I} M_i$ where each $M_i$ is a countably generated submodule. For each subset $A \subset I$, we write $M_A = \bigoplus_{i \in A} M_i, N_A =$ the image of $M_A$ under the projection $M \to N \hookrightarrow M$ and $L_A$ the same way. Now, consider the set of all triples ($J$, $B$, $C$) consisting of a subset $J \subset I$ and subsets $B, C \subset \mathfrak{F}$ such that $M_J = N_J \oplus L_J$ and $N_J, L_J$ are the direct sums of the modules in $B, C$. We give this set a partial ordering such that $(J, B, C) \le (J', B', C')$ if and only if $J \subset J'$, $B \subset B', C \subset C'$. By Zorn's lemma, the set contains a maximal element $(J, B, C)$. We shall show that $J = I$; i.e., $N = N_J = \bigoplus_{N' \in B} N' \in \mathfrak{F}$. Suppose otherwise. Then we can inductively construct a sequence of at most countable subsets $I_1 \subset I_2 \subset \cdots \subset I$ such that $I_1 \not\subset J$ and for each integer $n \ge 1$,

$$M_{I_n} \subset N_{I_n} + L_{I_n} \subset M_{I_{n+1}}$$.

Let $I' = \bigcup_0^\infty I_n$ and $J' = J \cup I'$. We claim:

$$M_{J'} = N_{J'} \oplus L_{J'}.$$

The inclusion $\subset$ is trivial. Conversely, $N_{J'}$ is the image of $N_J + L_J + M_{I'} \subset N_J + M_{I'}$ and so $N_{J'} \subset M_{J'}$. The same is also true for $L_{J'}$. Hence, the claim is valid.

Now, $N_J$ is a direct summand of $M$ (since it is a summand of $M_J$, which is a summand of $M$); i.e., $N_J \oplus M' = M$ for some $M'$. Then, by modular law, $N_{J'} = N_J \oplus (M' \cap N_{J'})$. Set $\widetilde{N_J} = M' \cap N_{J'}$. Define $\widetilde{L_J}$ in the same way. Then, using the early claim, we have:

$$M_{J'} = M_J \oplus \widetilde{N_J} \oplus \widetilde{L_J},$$

which implies that

$$\widetilde{N_J} \oplus \widetilde{L_J} \simeq M_{J'} / M_J \simeq M_{J' - J}$$

is countably generated as $J' - J \subset I'$. This contradicts the maximality of $(J, B, C)$. $\square$

Lemma 2—If $M_i, i \in I$ are countably generated modules with local endomorphism rings and if $N$ is a countably generated module that is a direct summand of $\bigoplus_{i \in I} M_i$, then $N$ is isomorphic to $\bigoplus_{i \in I'} M_i$ for some at most countable subset $I' \subset I$.

Proof: Let $\mathcal{G}$ denote the family of modules that are isomorphic to modules of the form $\bigoplus_{i \in F} M_i$ for some finite subset $F \subset I$. The assertion is then implied by the following claim:

- Given an element $x \in N$, there exists an $H \in \mathcal{G}$ that contains x and is a direct summand of N.

Indeed, assume the claim is valid. Then choose a sequence $x_1, x_2, \dots$ in N that is a generating set. Then using the claim, write $N = H_1 \oplus N_1$ where $x_1 \in H_1 \in \mathcal{G}$. Then we write $x_2 = y + z$ where $y \in H_1, z \in N_1$. We then decompose $N_1 = H_2 \oplus N_2$ with $z \in H_2 \in \mathcal{G}$. Note $\{ x_1, x_2 \} \subset H_1 \oplus H_2$. Repeating this argument, in the end, we have: $\{ x_1, x_2, \dots \} \subset \bigoplus_0^\infty H_n$; i.e., $N = \bigoplus_0^\infty H_n$. Hence, the proof reduces to proving the claim and the claim is a straightforward consequence of Azumaya's theorem (see the linked article for the argument). $\square$

Proof of the theorem: Let $N$ be a projective module over a local ring. Then, by definition, it is a direct summand of some free module $F$. This $F$ is in the family $\mathfrak{F}$ in Lemma 1; thus, $N$ is a direct sum of countably generated submodules, each a direct summand of F and thus projective. Hence, without loss of generality, we can assume $N$ is countably generated. Then Lemma 2 gives the theorem. $\square$

== Characterization of a local ring ==
Kaplansky's theorem can be stated in such a way to give a characterization of a local ring. A direct summand is said to be maximal if it has an indecomposable complement.

Theorem— Let R be a ring. Then the following are equivalent.

1. R is a local ring.
2. Every projective module over R is free and has an indecomposable decomposition $M = \bigoplus_{i \in I} M_i$ such that for each maximal direct summand L of M, there is a decomposition $M = \Big(\bigoplus_{j \in J} M_j\Big) \bigoplus L$ for some subset $J \subset I$.

The implication $1. \Rightarrow 2.$ is exactly (usual) Kaplansky's theorem and Azumaya's theorem. The converse $2. \Rightarrow 1.$ follows from the following general fact, which is interesting itself:

- A ring R is local $\Leftrightarrow$ for each nonzero proper direct summand M of $R^2 = R \times R$, either $R^2 = (0 \times R) \oplus M$ or $R^2 = (R \times 0) \oplus M$.

$(\Rightarrow)$ is by Azumaya's theorem as in the proof of $1. \Rightarrow 2.$. Conversely, suppose $R^2$ has the above property and that an element x in R is given. Consider the linear map $\sigma:R^2 \to R, \, \sigma(a, b) = a - b$. Set $y = x - 1$. Then $\sigma(x, y) = 1$, which is to say $\eta: R \to R^2, a \mapsto (ax, ay)$ splits and the image $M$ is a direct summand of $R^2$. It follows easily from that the assumption that either x or -y is a unit element. $\square$

== See also ==
- Krull–Schmidt category
