= Indecomposable module =

In abstract algebra, a module is indecomposable if it is non-zero and cannot be written as a direct sum of two non-zero submodules.

Indecomposable is a weaker notion than simple module (which is also sometimes called irreducible module): simple means "no proper submodule" N < M, while indecomposable "not expressible as N ⊕ P = M".

A direct sum of indecomposables is called completely decomposable; this is weaker than being semisimple, which is a direct sum of simple modules.

A direct sum decomposition of a module into indecomposable modules is called an indecomposable decomposition.

== Motivation ==
In many situations, all modules of interest are completely decomposable; the indecomposable modules can then be thought of as the "basic building blocks", the only objects that need to be studied. This is the case for modules over a field or PID, and underlies Jordan normal form of operators.

== Examples ==
=== Field ===
Modules over fields are vector spaces. A vector space is indecomposable if and only if its dimension is 1. So every vector space is completely decomposable (indeed, semisimple), with infinitely many summands if the dimension is infinite.

=== Principal ideal domain ===
Finitely-generated modules over principal ideal domains (PIDs) are classified by the structure theorem for finitely generated modules over a principal ideal domain: the primary decomposition is a decomposition into indecomposable modules, so every finitely-generated module over a PID is completely decomposable.

Explicitly, the modules of the form R/p^{n} for prime ideals p (including p = 0, which yields R) are indecomposable. Every finitely-generated R-module is a direct sum of these. Note that this is simple if and only if n = 1 (or p = 0); for example, the cyclic group of order 4, Z/4, is indecomposable but not simple – it has the subgroup 2Z/4 of order 2, but this does not have a complement.

Over the integers Z, modules are abelian groups. A finitely-generated abelian group is indecomposable if and only if it is isomorphic to Z or to a factor group of the form Z/p^{n}Z for some prime number p and some positive integer n. Every finitely-generated abelian group is a direct sum of (finitely many) indecomposable abelian groups.

There are, however, other indecomposable abelian groups which are not finitely generated; examples are the rational numbers Q and the Prüfer p-groups Z(p^{∞}) for any prime number p.

For a fixed positive integer n, consider the ring R of n-by-n matrices with entries from the real numbers (or from any other field K). Then K^{n} is a left R-module (the scalar multiplication is matrix multiplication). This is up to isomorphism the only indecomposable module over R. Every left R-module is a direct sum of (finitely or infinitely many) copies of this module K^{n}.

== Facts ==
Every simple module is indecomposable. The converse is not true in general, as is shown by the second example above.

By looking at the endomorphism ring of a module, one can tell whether the module is indecomposable: if and only if the endomorphism ring does not contain an idempotent element different from 0 and 1. (If f is such an idempotent endomorphism of M, then M is the direct sum of ker(f) and im(f).)

A module of finite length is indecomposable if and only if its endomorphism ring is local. Still more information about endomorphisms of finite-length indecomposables is provided by the Fitting lemma.

In the finite-length situation, decomposition into indecomposables is particularly useful, because of the Krull–Schmidt theorem: every finite-length module can be written as a direct sum of finitely many indecomposable modules, and this decomposition is essentially unique (meaning that if you have a different decomposition into indecomposables, then the summands of the first decomposition can be paired off with the summands of the second decomposition so that the members of each pair are isomorphic).
