= Krull–Schmidt theorem =

Mathematical theorem

In mathematics, the Krull–Schmidt theorem states that a group subjected to certain finiteness conditions on chains of subgroups, can be uniquely written as a finite direct product of indecomposable subgroups.

== Definitions ==
We say that a group G satisfies the ascending chain condition (ACC) on subgroups if every sequence of subgroups of G:

$$1 = G_0 \le G_1 \le G_2 \le \cdots\,$$

is eventually constant, i.e., there exists N such that G_{N} = G_{N+1} = G_{N+2} = ... . We say that G satisfies the ACC on normal subgroups if every such sequence of normal subgroups of G eventually becomes constant.

Likewise, one can define the descending chain condition on (normal) subgroups, by looking at all decreasing sequences of (normal) subgroups:

$$G = G_0 \ge G_1 \ge G_2 \ge \cdots.\,$$

Clearly, all finite groups satisfy both ACC and DCC on subgroups. The infinite cyclic group $\mathbf{Z}$ satisfies ACC but not DCC, since (2) > (2)^{2} > (2)^{3} > ... is an infinite decreasing sequence of subgroups. On the other hand, the $p^\infty$-torsion part of $\mathbf{Q}/\mathbf{Z}$ (the quasicyclic p-group) satisfies DCC but not ACC.

We say a group G is indecomposable if it cannot be written as a direct product of non-trivial subgroups G = H × K.

== Statement ==
If $G$ is a group that satisfies both ACC and DCC on normal subgroups, then there is exactly one way of writing $G$ as a direct product $G_1 \times G_2 \times\cdots \times G_k\,$ of finitely many indecomposable subgroups of $G$. Here, uniqueness means direct decompositions into indecomposable subgroups have the exchange property. That is: suppose $G = H_1 \times H_2 \times \cdots \times H_l\,$ is another expression of $G$ as a product of indecomposable subgroups. Then $k=l$ and there is a reindexing of the $H_i$'s satisfying

- $G_i$ and $H_i$ are isomorphic for each $i$;
- $G = G_1 \times \cdots \times G_r \times H_{r+1} \times\cdots\times H_l\,$ for each $r$.

== Proof ==
Proving existence is relatively straightforward: let S be the set of all normal subgroups that can not be written as a product of indecomposable subgroups. Moreover, any indecomposable subgroup is (trivially) the one-term direct product of itself, hence decomposable. If Krull-Schmidt fails, then S contains G; so we may iteratively construct a descending series of direct factors; this contradicts the DCC. One can then invert the construction to show that all direct factors of G appear in this way.

The proof of uniqueness, on the other hand, is quite long and requires a sequence of technical lemmas. For a complete exposition, see.

== Remark ==
The theorem does not assert the existence of a non-trivial decomposition, but merely that any such two decompositions (if they exist) are the same.

== Remak decomposition ==
A Remak decomposition, introduced by Robert Remak, is a decomposition of an abelian group or similar object into a finite direct sum of indecomposable objects. The Krull–Schmidt theorem gives conditions for a Remak decomposition to exist and for its factors to be unique.

== Krull–Schmidt theorem for modules ==
If $E \neq 0$ is a module that satisfies the ACC and DCC on submodules (that is, it is both Noetherian and Artinian or – equivalently – of finite length), then $E$ is a direct sum of indecomposable modules. Up to a permutation, the indecomposable components in such a direct sum are uniquely determined up to isomorphism.

Goro Azumaya generalised this, showing that if a module has a (possibly infinite) decomposition into strongly indecomposable modules, then this decomposition is unique up to a permutation and isomorphism. A module is strongly indecomposable if its ring of endomorphisms is local. Any such module is indecomposable, but the converse is not true, as witnessed by the ring of integers viewed as a module over itself. Indecomposable injectives and indecomposable modules of finite length are strongly indecomposable, as are indecomposable projective modules over semiperfect rings.

In general, the theorem fails if one only assumes that the module is Noetherian or Artinian.

== History ==
The present-day Krull–Schmidt theorem was first proved by Joseph Wedderburn (Ann. of Math (1909)), for finite groups, though he mentions some credit is due to an earlier study of G.A. Miller where direct products of abelian groups were considered. Wedderburn's theorem is stated as an exchange property between direct decompositions of maximum length. However, Wedderburn's proof makes no use of automorphisms.

The thesis of Robert Remak (1911) derived the same uniqueness result as Wedderburn but also proved (in modern terminology) that the group of central automorphisms acts transitively on the set of direct decompositions of maximum length of a finite group. From that stronger theorem Remak also proved various corollaries including that groups with a trivial center and perfect groups have a unique Remak decomposition.

Otto Schmidt (Sur les produits directs, S. M. F. Bull. 41 (1913), 161–164), simplified the main theorems of Remak to the 3 page predecessor to today's textbook proofs. His method improves Remak's use of idempotents to create the appropriate central automorphisms. Both Remak and Schmidt published subsequent proofs and corollaries to their theorems.

Wolfgang Krull (Über verallgemeinerte endliche Abelsche Gruppen, M. Z. 23 (1925) 161–196), returned to G.A. Miller's original problem of direct products of abelian groups by extending to abelian operator groups with ascending and descending chain conditions. This is most often stated in the language of modules. His proof observes that the idempotents used in the proofs of Remak and Schmidt can be restricted to module homomorphisms; the remaining details of the proof are largely unchanged.

O. Ore unified the proofs from various categories including finite groups, abelian operator groups, rings, and algebras by proving the exchange theorem of Wedderburn holds for modular lattices with descending and ascending chain conditions. This proof makes no use of idempotents and does not reprove the transitivity of Remak's theorems.

Kurosh's The Theory of Groups and Zassenhaus' The Theory of Groups include the proofs of Schmidt and Ore under the name of Remak–Schmidt but acknowledge Wedderburn and Ore. Later texts use the title Krull–Schmidt (Hungerford's Algebra) and Krull–Schmidt–Azumaya (Curtis–Reiner). The name Krull–Schmidt is now popularly substituted for any theorem concerning uniqueness of direct products of maximum size. Some authors choose to call direct decompositions of maximum-size Remak decompositions to honor his contributions.

== See also ==
- Krull–Schmidt category
