= Module homomorphism =

Linear map over a ring

In algebra, a module homomorphism is a function between modules that preserves the module structures. Explicitly, if M and N are left modules over a ring R, then a function $f: M \to N$ is called an R-module homomorphism or an R-linear map if for any x, y in M and r in R,

$$f(x + y) = f(x) + f(y),$$
$$f(rx) = rf(x).$$

In other words, f is a group homomorphism (for the underlying additive groups) that commutes with scalar multiplication. If M, N are right R-modules, then the second condition is replaced with

$$f(xr) = f(x)r.$$

The preimage of the zero element under f is called the kernel of f. The set of all module homomorphisms from M to N is denoted by $\operatorname{Hom}_R(M, N)$. It is an abelian group (under pointwise addition) but is not necessarily a module unless R is commutative.

The composition of module homomorphisms is again a module homomorphism, and the identity map on a module is a module homomorphism. Thus, all the (say left) modules together with all the module homomorphisms between them form the category of modules.

== Terminology ==
A module homomorphism is called a module isomorphism if it admits an inverse homomorphism; in particular, it is a bijection. Conversely, one can show a bijective module homomorphism is an isomorphism; i.e., the inverse is a module homomorphism. In particular, a module homomorphism is an isomorphism if and only if it is an isomorphism between the underlying abelian groups.

The isomorphism theorems hold for module homomorphisms.

A module homomorphism from a module M to itself is called an endomorphism and an isomorphism from M to itself an automorphism. One writes $\operatorname{End}_R(M) = \operatorname{Hom}_R(M, M)$ for the set of all endomorphisms of a module M. It is not only an abelian group but is also a ring with multiplication given by function composition, called the endomorphism ring of M. The group of units of this ring is the automorphism group of M.

Schur's lemma says that a homomorphism between simple modules (modules with no non-trivial submodules) must be either zero or an isomorphism. In particular, the endomorphism ring of a simple module is a division ring.

In the language of the category theory, an injective homomorphism is also called a monomorphism and a surjective homomorphism an epimorphism.

== Examples ==
- The zero map M → N that maps every element to zero.
- A linear transformation between vector spaces.
- $\operatorname{Hom}_{\mathbb{Z}}(\mathbb{Z}/n, \mathbb{Z}/m) = \mathbb{Z}/\operatorname{gcd}(n,m)$.
- For a commutative ring R and ideals I, J, there is the canonical identification
  $$\operatorname{Hom}_R(R/I, R/J) = \{ r \in R | r I \subset J \}/J$$

given by $f \mapsto f(1)$. In particular, $\operatorname{Hom}_R(R/I, R)$ is the annihilator of I.

- Given a ring R and an element r, let $l_r: R \to R$ denote the left multiplication by r. Then for any s, t in R,
  $$l_r(st) = rst = l_r(s)t$$.

That is, $l_r$ is right R-linear.

- For any ring R,
  - $\operatorname{End}_R(R) = R$ as rings when R is viewed as a right module over itself. Explicitly, this isomorphism is given by the left regular representation $R \overset{\sim}\to \operatorname{End}_R(R), \, r \mapsto l_r$.
  - Similarly, $\operatorname{End}_R(R) = R^{op}$ as rings when R is viewed as a left module over itself. Textbooks or other references usually specify which convention is used.
  - $\operatorname{Hom}_R(R, M) = M$ through $f \mapsto f(1)$ for any left module M. (The module structure on Hom here comes from the right R-action on R; see #Module structures on Hom below.)
  - $\operatorname{Hom}_R(M, R)$ is called the dual module of M; it is a left (resp. right) module if M is a right (resp. left) module over R with the module structure coming from the R-action on R. It is denoted by $M^*$.
- Given a ring homomorphism R → S of commutative rings and an S-module M, an R-linear map θ: S → M is called a derivation if for any f, g in S, θ(f g) = f θ(g) + θ(f) g.
- If S, T are unital associative algebras over a ring R, then an algebra homomorphism from S to T is a ring homomorphism that is also an R-module homomorphism.

== Module structures on Hom ==
In short, Hom inherits a ring action that was not used up to form Hom. More precise, let M, N be left R-modules. Suppose M has a right action of a ring S that commutes with the R-action; i.e., M is an (R, S)-module. Then

$$\operatorname{Hom}_R(M, N)$$

has the structure of a left S-module defined by: for s in S and x in M,

$$(s \cdot f)(x) = f(xs).$$

It is well-defined (i.e., $s \cdot f$ is R-linear) since

$$(s \cdot f)(rx) = f(rxs) = rf(xs) = r (s \cdot f)(x),$$

and $s \cdot f$ is a ring action since

$$(st \cdot f)(x) = f(xst) = (t \cdot f)(xs) = s \cdot (t \cdot f)(x)$$.

Note: the above verification would "fail" if one used the left R-action in place of the right S-action. In this sense, Hom is often said to "use up" the R-action.

Similarly, if M is a left R-module and N is an (R, S)-module, then $\operatorname{Hom}_R(M, N)$ is a right S-module by $(f \cdot s)(x) = f(x)s$.

== A matrix representation ==
The relationship between matrices and linear transformations in linear algebra generalizes in a natural way to module homomorphisms between free modules. Precisely, given a right R-module U, there is the canonical isomorphism of the abelian groups

$$\operatorname{Hom}_R(U^{\oplus n}, U^{\oplus m}) \overset{f \mapsto [f_{ij}]}\underset{\sim}\to M_{m, n}(\operatorname{End}_R(U))$$

obtained by viewing $U^{\oplus n}$ consisting of column vectors and then writing f as an m × n matrix. In particular, viewing R as a right R-module and using $\operatorname{End}_R(R) \simeq R$, one has

$$\operatorname{End}_R(R^n) \simeq M_n(R)$$,

which turns out to be a ring isomorphism (as a composition corresponds to a matrix multiplication).

Note the above isomorphism is canonical; no choice is involved. On the other hand, if one is given a module homomorphism between finite-rank free modules, then a choice of an ordered basis corresponds to a choice of an isomorphism $F \simeq R^n$. The above procedure then gives the matrix representation with respect to such choices of the bases. For more general modules, matrix representations may either lack uniqueness or not exist.

== Defining ==
In practice, one often defines a module homomorphism by specifying its values on a generating set. More precisely, let M and N be left R-modules. Suppose a subset S generates M; i.e., there is a surjection $F \to M$ with a free module F with a basis indexed by S and kernel K (i.e., one has a free presentation). Then to give a module homomorphism $M \to N$ is to give a module homomorphism $F \to N$ that kills K (i.e., maps K to zero).

== Operations ==
If $f: M \to N$ and $g: M' \to N'$ are module homomorphisms, then their direct sum is

$$f \oplus g: M \oplus M' \to N \oplus N', \, (x, y) \mapsto (f(x), g(y))$$

and their tensor product is

$$f \otimes g: M \otimes M' \to N \otimes N', \, x \otimes y \mapsto f(x) \otimes g(y).$$

Let $f: M \to N$ be a module homomorphism between left modules. The graph Γ_{f} of f is the submodule of M ⊕ N given by

$$\Gamma_f = \{ (x, f(x)) | x \in M \}$$,

which is the image of the module homomorphism M → M ⊕ N, x → (x, f(x)), called the graph morphism.

The transpose of f is

$$f^*: N^* \to M^*, \, f^*(\alpha) = \alpha \circ f.$$

If f is an isomorphism, then the transpose of the inverse of f is called the contragredient of f.

== Exact sequences ==
Consider a sequence of module homomorphisms

$$\cdots \overset{f_3}\longrightarrow M_2 \overset{f_2}\longrightarrow M_1 \overset{f_1}\longrightarrow M_0 \overset{f_0}\longrightarrow M_{-1} \overset{f_{-1}}\longrightarrow \cdots.$$

Such a sequence is called a chain complex (or often just complex) if each composition is zero; i.e., $f_i \circ f_{i+1} = 0$ or equivalently the image of $f_{i+1}$ is contained in the kernel of $f_i$. (If the numbers increase instead of decrease, then it is called a cochain complex; e.g., de Rham complex.) A chain complex is called an exact sequence if $\operatorname{im}(f_{i+1}) = \operatorname{ker}(f_i)$. A special case of an exact sequence is a short exact sequence:

$$0 \to A \overset{f}\to B \overset{g}\to C \to 0$$

where $f$ is injective, the kernel of $g$ is the image of $f$ and $g$ is surjective.

Any module homomorphism $f : M \to N$ defines an exact sequence

$$0 \to K \to M \overset{f}\to N \to C \to 0,$$

where $K$ is the kernel of $f$, and $C$ is the cokernel, that is the quotient of $N$ by the image of $f$.

In the case of modules over a commutative ring, a sequence is exact if and only if it is exact at all the maximal ideals; that is all sequences

$$0 \to A_{\mathfrak{m}} \overset{f}\to B_{\mathfrak{m}} \overset{g}\to C_{\mathfrak{m}} \to 0$$

are exact, where the subscript ${\mathfrak{m}}$ means the localization at a maximal ideal ${\mathfrak{m}}$.

If $f : M \to B, g: N \to B$ are module homomorphisms, then they are said to form a fiber square (or pullback square), denoted by M ×_{B} N, if it fits into

$$0 \to M \times_{B} N \to M \times N \overset{\phi}\to B \to 0$$

where $\phi(x, y) = f(x) - g(x)$.

Example: Let $B \subset A$ be commutative rings, and let I be the annihilator of the quotient B-module A/B (which is an ideal of A). Then canonical maps $A \to A/I, B/I \to A/I$ form a fiber square with $B = A \times_{A/I} B/I.$

== Endomorphisms of finitely generated modules ==
Let $\phi: M \to M$ be an endomorphism between finitely generated R-modules for a commutative ring R. Then

- $\phi$ is killed by its characteristic polynomial relative to the generators of M; see Nakayama's lemma#Proof.
- If $\phi$ is surjective, then it is injective.

See also: Herbrand quotient (which can be defined for any endomorphism with some finiteness conditions.)

== Variant: additive relations ==
An additive relation $M \to N$ from a module M to a module N is a submodule of $M \oplus N.$ In other words, it is a "many-valued" homomorphism defined on some submodule of M. The inverse $f^{-1}$ of f is the submodule $\{ (y, x) | (x, y) \in f \}$. Any additive relation f determines a homomorphism from a submodule of M to a quotient of N

$$D(f) \to N/\{ y | (0, y) \in f \}$$

where $D(f)$ consists of all elements x in M such that (x, y) belongs to f for some y in N.

A transgression that arises from a spectral sequence is an example of an additive relation.

== See also ==
- Mapping cone (homological algebra)
- Smith normal form
- Chain complex
- Pairing
