= Local ring =

(Mathematical) ring with a unique maximal ideal

In mathematics, more specifically in ring theory, local rings are certain rings that are comparatively simple, and serve to describe what is called "local behaviour", in the sense of functions defined on algebraic varieties or manifolds, or of algebraic number fields examined at a particular place, or prime. Local algebra is the branch of commutative algebra that studies commutative local rings and their modules.

In practice, a commutative local ring often arises as the result of the localization of a ring at a prime ideal.

The concept of local rings was introduced by Wolfgang Krull in 1938 under the name Stellenringe. The English term local ring is due to Zariski.

== Definition and first consequences ==
A ring R is a local ring if it has any one of the following equivalent properties:

- R has a unique maximal left ideal.
- R has a unique maximal right ideal.
- 1 ≠ 0 and the sum of any two non-units in R is a non-unit.
- 1 ≠ 0 and if x is any element of R, then x or 1 − x is a unit.
- If a finite sum is a unit, then it has a term that is a unit (this says in particular that the empty sum cannot be a unit, so it implies 1 ≠ 0).

If these properties hold, then the unique maximal left ideal coincides with the unique maximal right ideal and with the ring's Jacobson radical. The third of the properties listed above says that the set of non-units in a local ring forms a (proper) ideal, necessarily contained in the Jacobson radical. The fourth property can be paraphrased as follows: a ring R is local if and only if there do not exist two coprime proper (principal) (left) ideals, where two ideals I_{1}, I_{2} are called coprime if R = I_{1} + I_{2}.

In the case of commutative rings, one does not have to distinguish between left, right and two-sided ideals: a commutative ring is local if and only if it has a unique maximal ideal. Before about 1960 many authors required that a local ring be (left and right) Noetherian, and (possibly non-Noetherian) local rings were called quasi-local rings. In this article this requirement is not imposed.

A local ring that is an integral domain is called a local domain.

== Examples ==
- All fields (and skew fields) are local rings, since {0} is the only maximal ideal in these rings.
- The ring $\mathbb{Z}/p^n\mathbb{Z}$ is a local ring (p prime, n ≥ 1). The unique maximal ideal consists of all multiples of p.
- More generally, a nonzero ring in which every element is either a unit or nilpotent is a local ring.
- An important class of local rings are discrete valuation rings, which are local principal ideal domains that are not fields.
- The ring $\mathbb{C}[[x]]$, whose elements are infinite series $\sum_{i=0}^\infty a_ix^i$ where multiplications are given by $(\sum_{i=0}^\infty a_ix^i)(\sum_{i=0}^\infty b_ix^i)=\sum_{i=0}^\infty c_ix^i$ such that $c_n=\sum_{i+j=n}a_ib_j$, is local. Its unique maximal ideal consists of all elements that are not invertible. In other words, it consists of all elements with constant term zero.
- More generally, every ring of formal power series over a local ring is local; the maximal ideal consists of those power series with constant term in the maximal ideal of the base ring.
- Similarly, the algebra of dual numbers over any field is local. More generally, if F is a local ring and n is a positive integer, then the quotient ring F[X]/(X^{n}) is local with maximal ideal consisting of the classes of polynomials with constant term belonging to the maximal ideal of F, since one can use a geometric series to invert all other polynomials modulo X^{n}. If F is a field, then elements of F[X]/(X^{n}) are either nilpotent or invertible. (The dual numbers over F correspond to the case n = 2.)
- Nonzero quotient rings of local rings are local.
- The ring of rational numbers with odd denominator is local; its maximal ideal consists of the fractions with even numerator and odd denominator. It is $\mathbb{Z}_{(2)}$, the integers localized at 2.
- More generally, given any commutative ring R and any prime ideal P of R, the localization of R at P is local; the maximal ideal is the ideal generated by P in this localization; that is, the maximal ideal consists of all elements a/s with a ∈ P and s ∈ R - P.

=== Non-examples ===
- The ring of polynomials $K[x]$ over a field $K$ is not local, since $x$ and $1 - x$ are non-units, but their sum is a unit.
- The ring of integers $\Z$ is not local since it has a maximal ideal $(p)$ for every prime $p$.
- $\Z$/(pq)$\Z$, where p and q are distinct prime numbers. Both (p) and (q) are maximal ideals here.

=== Ring of germs ===
To motivate the name "local" for these rings, we consider real-valued continuous functions defined on some open interval around $0$ of the real line. We are only interested in the behavior of these functions near $0$ (their "local behavior") and we will therefore identify two functions if they agree on some (possibly very small) open interval around $0$. This identification defines an equivalence relation, and the equivalence classes are what are called the "germs of real-valued continuous functions at $0$". These germs can be added and multiplied and form a commutative ring.

To see that this ring of germs is local, we need to characterize its invertible elements. A germ $f$ is invertible if and only if $f(0)\neq 0$. The reason: if $f(0)\neq 0$, then by continuity there is an open interval around $0$ where $f$ is non-zero, and we can form the function $g(x)=\frac 1{f(x)}$ on this interval. The function $g$ gives rise to a germ, and the product of $fg$ is equal to $1$. (Conversely, if $f$ is invertible, then there is some $g$ such that $f(0)g(0)=1$, hence $f(0)\neq 0$.)

With this characterization, it is clear that the sum of any two non-invertible germs is again non-invertible, and we have a commutative local ring. The maximal ideal of this ring consists precisely of those germs $f$ with $f(0)=0$.

Exactly the same arguments work for the ring of germs of continuous real-valued functions on any topological space at a given point, or the ring of germs of differentiable functions on any differentiable manifold at a given point, or the ring of germs of rational functions on any algebraic variety at a given point. All these rings are therefore local. These examples help to explain why schemes, the generalizations of varieties, are defined as special locally ringed spaces.

=== Valuation theory ===
Local rings play a major role in valuation theory. By definition, a valuation ring of a field K is a subring R such that for every non-zero element x of K, at least one of x and x^{−1} is in R. Any such subring will be a local ring. For example, the ring of rational numbers with odd denominator (mentioned above) is a valuation ring in $\mathbb{Q}$.

Given a field K, which may or may not be a function field, we may look for local rings in it. If K were indeed the function field of an algebraic variety V, then for each point P of V we could try to define a valuation ring R of functions "defined at" P. In cases where V has dimension 2 or more there is a difficulty that is seen this way: if F and G are rational functions on V with

F(P) = G(P) = 0,

the function

F/G

is an indeterminate form at P. Considering a simple example, such as

Y/X,

approached along a line

Y = tX,

one sees that the value at P is a concept without a simple definition. It is replaced by using valuations.

=== Non-commutative ===
Non-commutative local rings arise naturally as endomorphism rings in the study of direct sum decompositions of modules over some other rings. Specifically, if the endomorphism ring of the module M is local, then M is indecomposable; conversely, if the module M has finite length and is indecomposable, then its endomorphism ring is local.

If k is a field of characteristic p > 0 and G is a finite p-group, then the group algebra kG is local.

== Some facts and definitions ==
=== Commutative case ===
We also write (R, m) for a commutative local ring R with maximal ideal m. Every such ring becomes a topological ring in a natural way if one takes the powers of m as a neighborhood base of 0. This is the m-adic topology on R. If (R, m) is a commutative Noetherian local ring, then

$$\bigcap_{i=1}^\infty m^i = \{0\}$$

(Krull's intersection theorem), and it follows that R with the m-adic topology is a Hausdorff space. The theorem is a consequence of the Artin–Rees lemma together with Nakayama's lemma, and, as such, the "Noetherian" assumption is crucial. Indeed, let R be the ring of germs of infinitely differentiable functions at 0 in the real line and m be the maximal ideal $(x)$. Then a nonzero function $e^{-{1 \over x^2}}$ belongs to $m^n$ for any n, since that function divided by $x^n$ is still smooth.

As for any topological ring, one can ask whether (R, m) is complete (as a uniform space); if it is not, one considers its completion, again a local ring. Complete Noetherian local rings are classified by the Cohen structure theorem.

In algebraic geometry, especially when R is the local ring of a scheme at some point P, R / m is called the residue field of the local ring or residue field of the point P.

If (R, m) and (S, n) are local rings, then a local ring homomorphism from R to S is a ring homomorphism f : R → S with the property f(m) ⊆ n. These are precisely the ring homomorphisms that are continuous with respect to the given topologies on R and S. For example, consider the ring morphism $\mathbb{C}[x]/(x^3) \to \mathbb{C}[x,y]/(x^3,x^2y,y^4)$ sending $x \mapsto x$. The preimage of $(x,y)$ is $(x)$. Another example of a local ring morphism is given by $\mathbb{C}[x]/(x^3) \to \mathbb{C}[x]/(x^2)$.

=== General case ===
The Jacobson radical m of a local ring R (which is equal to the unique maximal left ideal and also to the unique maximal right ideal) consists precisely of the non-units of the ring; furthermore, it is the unique maximal two-sided ideal of R. However, in the non-commutative case, having a unique maximal two-sided ideal is not equivalent to being local.

For an element x of the local ring R, the following are equivalent:

- x has a left inverse
- x has a right inverse
- x is invertible
- x is not in m.

If (R, m) is local, then the factor ring R/m is a skew field. If J ≠ R is any two-sided ideal in R, then the factor ring R/J is again local, with maximal ideal m/J.

A deep theorem by Irving Kaplansky says that any projective module over a local ring is free, though the case where the module is finitely-generated is a simple corollary to Nakayama's lemma. This has an interesting consequence in terms of Morita equivalence. Namely, if P is a finitely generated projective R module, then P is isomorphic to the free module R^{n}, and hence the ring of endomorphisms $\mathrm{End}_R(P)$ is isomorphic to the full ring of matrices $\mathrm{M}_n(R)$. Since every ring Morita equivalent to the local ring R is of the form $\mathrm{End}_R(P)$ for such a P, the conclusion is that the only rings Morita equivalent to a local ring R are (isomorphic to) the matrix rings over R.

== See also ==
- Discrete valuation ring
- Heyting field
- Semi-local ring
- Gorenstein local ring
- Regular local ring
