= Direct sum of modules =

Operation in abstract algebra

In abstract algebra, the direct sum is a construction which combines several modules into a new, larger module. The direct sum of modules is the smallest module which contains the given modules as submodules with no "unnecessary" constraints, making it an example of a coproduct. Contrast with the direct product, which is the dual notion.

The most familiar examples of this construction occur when considering vector spaces (modules over a field) and abelian groups (modules over the ring Z of integers). The construction may also be extended to cover Banach spaces and Hilbert spaces.

See the article decomposition of a module for a way to write a module as a direct sum of submodules.

== Construction for vector spaces and abelian groups ==
We give the construction first in these two cases, under the assumption that we have only two objects. Then we generalize to an arbitrary family of arbitrary modules. The key elements of the general construction are more clearly identified by considering these two cases in depth.

=== Construction for two vector spaces ===
Suppose V and W are vector spaces over the field K. The Cartesian product V × W can be given the structure of a vector space over K (Halmos 1974, §18) by defining the operations componentwise:

- (v_{1}, w_{1}) + (v_{2}, w_{2}) = (v_{1} + v_{2}, w_{1} + w_{2})
- α (v, w) = (α v, α w)

for v, v_{1}, v_{2} ∈ V, w, w_{1}, w_{2} ∈ W, and α ∈ K.

The resulting vector space is called the direct sum of V and W and is usually denoted by a plus symbol inside a circle:
$$V \oplus W$$

It is customary to write the elements of an ordered sum not as ordered pairs (v, w), but as a sum v + w.

The subspace V × {0} of V ⊕ W is isomorphic to V and is often identified with V; similarly for {0} × W and W. (See internal direct sum below.) With this identification, every element of V ⊕ W can be written in one and only one way as the sum of an element of V and an element of W. The dimension of V ⊕ W is equal to the sum of the dimensions of V and W. One elementary use is the reconstruction of a finite vector space from any subspace W and its orthogonal complement:
$$\mathbb{R}^n = W \oplus W^{\perp}$$

This construction readily generalizes to any finite number of vector spaces.

=== Construction for two abelian groups ===
For abelian groups G and H which are written additively, the direct product of G and H is also called a direct sum (Mac Lane & Birkhoff 1999, §V.6). Thus the Cartesian product G × H is equipped with the structure of an abelian group by defining the operations componentwise:

(g_{1}, h_{1}) + (g_{2}, h_{2}) = (g_{1} + g_{2}, h_{1} + h_{2})

for g_{1}, g_{2} in G, and h_{1}, h_{2} in H.

Integral multiples are similarly defined componentwise by

n(g, h) = (ng, nh)

for g in G, h in H, and n an integer. This parallels the extension of the scalar product of vector spaces to the direct sum above.

The resulting abelian group is called the direct sum of G and H and is usually denoted by a plus symbol inside a circle:
$$G \oplus H$$

It is customary to write the elements of an ordered sum not as ordered pairs (g, h), but as a sum g + h.

The subgroup G × {0} of G ⊕ H is isomorphic to G and is often identified with G; similarly for {0} × H and H. (See internal direct sum below.) With this identification, it is true that every element of G ⊕ H can be written in one and only one way as the sum of an element of G and an element of H. The rank of G ⊕ H is equal to the sum of the ranks of G and H.

This construction readily generalises to any finite number of abelian groups.

== Construction for an arbitrary family of modules ==
One should notice a clear similarity between the definitions of the direct sum of two vector spaces and of two abelian groups. In fact, each is a special case of the construction of the direct sum of two modules. Additionally, by modifying the definition one can accommodate the direct sum of an infinite family of modules. The precise definition is as follows (Bourbaki 1989, §II.1.6).

Let R be a ring, and {M_{i} : i ∈ I} a family of left R-modules indexed by the set I. The direct sum of {M_{i}} is then defined to be the set of all sequences $(\alpha_i)$ where $\alpha_i \in M_i$ and $\alpha_i = 0$ for cofinitely many indices i. (The direct product is analogous but the indices do not need to cofinitely vanish.)

It can also be defined as functions α from I to the disjoint union of the modules M_{i} such that α(i) ∈ M_{i} for all i ∈ I and α(i) = 0 for cofinitely many indices i. These functions can equivalently be regarded as finitely supported sections of the fiber bundle over the index set I, with the fiber over $i \in I$ being $M_i$.

This set inherits the module structure via component-wise addition and scalar multiplication. Explicitly, two such sequences (or functions) α and β can be added by writing $(\alpha + \beta)_i = \alpha_i + \beta_i$ for all i (note that this is again zero for all but finitely many indices), and such a function can be multiplied with an element r from R by defining $r(\alpha)_i = (r\alpha)_i$ for all i. In this way, the direct sum becomes a left R-module, and it is denoted
$$\bigoplus_{i \in I} M_i.$$

It is customary to write the sequence $(\alpha_i)$ as a sum $\sum \alpha_i$. Sometimes a primed summation $\sum ' \alpha_i$ is used to indicate that cofinitely many of the terms are zero.

== Properties ==
- The direct sum is a submodule of the direct product of the modules M_{i} (Bourbaki 1989, §II.1.7). The direct product is the set of all functions α from I to the disjoint union of the modules M_{i} with α(i)∈M_{i}, but not necessarily vanishing for all but finitely many i. If the index set I is finite, then the direct sum and the direct product are equal.
- Each of the modules M_{i} may be identified with the submodule of the direct sum consisting of those functions which vanish on all indices different from i. With these identifications, every element x of the direct sum can be written in one and only one way as a sum of finitely many elements from the modules M_{i}.
- If the M_{i} are actually vector spaces, then the dimension of the direct sum is equal to the sum of the dimensions of the M_{i}. The same is true for the rank of abelian groups and the length of modules.
- Every vector space over the field K is isomorphic to a direct sum of sufficiently many copies of K, so in a sense only these direct sums have to be considered. This is not true for modules over arbitrary rings.
- The tensor product distributes over direct sums in the following sense: if N is some right R-module, then the direct sum of the tensor products of N with M_{i} (which are abelian groups) is naturally isomorphic to the tensor product of N with the direct sum of the M_{i}.
- Direct sums are commutative and associative (up to isomorphism), meaning that it doesn't matter in which order one forms the direct sum.
- The abelian group of R-linear homomorphisms from the direct sum to some left R-module L is naturally isomorphic to the direct product of the abelian groups of R-linear homomorphisms from M_{i} to L:
  $$\operatorname{Hom}_R\biggl( \bigoplus_{i \in I} M_i,L\biggr) \cong \prod_{i \in I}\operatorname{Hom}_R\left(M_i,L\right).$$
  Indeed, there is clearly a homomorphism τ from the left hand side to the right hand side, where τ(θ)(i) is the R-linear homomorphism sending x∈M_{i} to θ(x) (using the natural inclusion of M_{i} into the direct sum). The inverse of the homomorphism τ is defined by
  $$\tau^{-1}(\beta)(\alpha) = \sum_{i\in I} \beta(i)(\alpha(i))$$
  for any α in the direct sum of the modules M_{i}. The key point is that the definition of τ^{−1} makes sense because α(i) is zero for all but finitely many i, and so the sum is finite.
  In particular, the dual vector space of a direct sum of vector spaces is isomorphic to the direct product of the duals of those spaces.
- The finite direct sum of modules is a biproduct: If
  $$p_k: A_1 \oplus \cdots \oplus A_n \to A_k$$
  are the canonical projection mappings and
  $$i_k: A_k \mapsto A_1 \oplus \cdots \oplus A_n$$
  are the inclusion mappings, then
  $$i_1 \circ p_1 + \cdots + i_n \circ p_n$$
  equals the identity morphism of A_{1} ⊕ ⋯ ⊕ A_{n}, and
  $$p_k \circ i_l$$
  is the identity morphism of A_{k} in the case l = k, and is the zero map otherwise.

== Internal direct sum ==
Suppose M is an R-module and M_{i} is a submodule of M for each i in I. If every x in M can be written in exactly one way as a sum of finitely many elements of the M_{i}, then we say that M is the internal direct sum of the submodules M_{i} (Halmos 1974, §18). In this case, M is naturally isomorphic to the (external) direct sum of the M_{i} as defined above (Adamson 1972, p.61).

A submodule N of M is a direct summand of M if there exists some other submodule N′ of M such that M is the internal direct sum of N and N′. In this case, N and N′ are called complementary submodules.

== Universal property ==
In the language of category theory, the direct sum is a coproduct and hence a colimit in the category of left R-modules, which means that it is characterized by the following universal property. For every i in I, consider the natural embedding

$$j_i : M_i \rightarrow \bigoplus_{i \in I} M_i$$

which sends the elements of M_{i} to those functions which are zero for all arguments but i. Now let M be an arbitrary R-module and f_{i} : M_{i} → M be arbitrary R-linear maps for every i, then there exists precisely one R-linear map

$$f : \bigoplus_{i \in I} M_i \rightarrow M$$

such that f o j_{i} = f_{i} for all i.

== Grothendieck group ==
The direct sum gives a collection of objects the structure of a commutative monoid, in that the addition of objects is defined, but not subtraction. In fact, subtraction can be defined, and every commutative monoid can be extended to an abelian group. This extension is known as the Grothendieck group. The extension is done by defining equivalence classes of pairs of objects, which allows certain pairs to be treated as inverses. The construction, detailed in the article on the Grothendieck group, is "universal", in that it has the universal property of being unique, and homomorphic to any other embedding of a commutative monoid in an abelian group.

== Direct sum of modules with additional structure ==
If the modules we are considering carry some additional structure (for example, a norm or an inner product), then the direct sum of the modules can often be made to carry this additional structure, as well. In this case, we obtain the coproduct in the appropriate category of all objects carrying the additional structure. Two prominent examples occur for Banach spaces and Hilbert spaces.

What in some classical texts is called a "direct sum" of algebras over a field is now called a direct product of algebras; see the article on direct product for information on these.

=== Direct sum of Banach spaces ===
The direct sum of two Banach spaces $X$ and $Y$ is the direct sum of $X$ and $Y$ considered as vector spaces, with the norm $\|(x, y)\| = \|x\|_X + \|y\|_Y$ for all $x \in X$ and $y \in Y.$

Generally, if $X_i$ is a collection of Banach spaces, where $i$ traverses the index set $I,$ then the direct sum $\bigoplus_{i \in I} X_i$ is a module consisting of all functions $x$ defined over $I$ such that $x(i) \in X_i$ for all $i \in I$ and
$$\sum_{i \in I} \|x(i)\|_{X_i} < \infty.$$

The norm is given by the sum above. The direct sum with this norm is again a Banach space.

For example, if we take the index set $I = \N$ and $X_i = \R,$ then the direct sum $\bigoplus_{i \in \N} X_i$ is the space $\ell_1,$ which consists of all the sequences $\left(a_i\right)$ of reals with finite norm $\|a\| = \sum_i \left|a_i\right|.$

A closed subspace $A$ of a Banach space $X$ is complemented if there is another closed subspace $B$ of $X$ such that $X$ is equal to the internal direct sum $A \oplus B.$ Note that not every closed subspace is complemented; e.g. $c_0$ is not complemented in $\ell^\infty.$

=== Direct sum of modules with bilinear forms ===
Let $\left\{ \left(M_i, b_i\right) : i \in I \right\}$ be a family indexed by $I$ of modules equipped with bilinear forms. The orthogonal direct sum is the module direct sum with bilinear form $B$ defined by
$$B\left({\left({x_i}\right),\left({y_i}\right)}\right) = \sum_{i\in I} b_i\left({x_i,y_i}\right)$$
in which the summation makes sense even for infinite index sets $I$ because only finitely many of the terms are non-zero.

=== Direct sum of Hilbert spaces ===
If finitely many Hilbert spaces $H_1, \ldots, H_n$ are given, one can construct their orthogonal direct sum as above (since they are vector spaces), defining the inner product as:
$$\left\langle \left(x_1, \ldots, x_n\right), \left(y_1, \ldots, y_n\right) \right\rangle = \langle x_1, y_1 \rangle + \cdots + \langle x_n, y_n \rangle.$$

The resulting direct sum is a Hilbert space which contains the given Hilbert spaces as mutually orthogonal subspaces.

If infinitely many Hilbert spaces $H_i$ for $i \in I$ are given, we can carry out the same construction; notice that when defining the inner product, only finitely many summands will be non-zero. However, the result will only be an inner product space and it will not necessarily be complete. We then define the direct sum of the Hilbert spaces $H_i$ to be the completion of this inner product space.

Alternatively and equivalently, one can define the direct sum of the Hilbert spaces $H_i$ as the space of all functions α with domain $I,$ such that $\alpha(i)$ is an element of $H_i$ for every $i \in I$ and:
$$\sum_i \left\|\alpha_{(i)}\right\|^2 < \infty.$$

The inner product of two such function α and β is then defined as:
$$\langle\alpha,\beta\rangle=\sum_i \langle \alpha_i,\beta_i \rangle.$$

This space is complete and we get a Hilbert space.

For example, if we take the index set $I = \N$ and $X_i = \R,$ then the direct sum $\oplus_{i \in \N} X_i$ is the space $\ell_2,$ which consists of all the sequences $\left(a_i\right)$ of reals with finite norm $\|a\| = \sqrt{\sum_i \left\|a_i\right\|^2}.$ Comparing this with the example for Banach spaces, we see that the Banach space direct sum and the Hilbert space direct sum are not necessarily the same. But if there are only finitely many summands, then the Banach space direct sum is isomorphic to the Hilbert space direct sum, although the norm will be different.

Every Hilbert space is isomorphic to a direct sum of sufficiently many copies of the base field, which is either $\R \text{ or } \Complex.$ This is equivalent to the assertion that every Hilbert space has an orthonormal basis. More generally, every closed subspace of a Hilbert space is complemented because it admits an orthogonal complement. Conversely, the Lindenstrauss–Tzafriri theorem asserts that if every closed subspace of a Banach space is complemented, then the Banach space is isomorphic (topologically) to a Hilbert space.

== See also ==
- Biproduct – Object that is both a product and coproduct
- Indecomposable module
- Jordan–Hölder theorem – Decomposition of an algebraic structure
- Krull–Schmidt theorem – Mathematical theorem
- Split exact sequence – Type of short exact sequence in mathematics
