= Quasi-Frobenius ring =

In mathematics, especially ring theory, the class of Frobenius rings and their generalizations are the extension of work done on Frobenius algebras. Perhaps the most important generalization is that of quasi-Frobenius rings (QF rings), which are in turn generalized by right pseudo-Frobenius rings (PF rings) and right finitely pseudo-Frobenius rings (FPF rings). Other diverse generalizations of quasi-Frobenius rings include QF-1, QF-2 and QF-3 rings.

These types of rings can be viewed as descendants of algebras examined by Georg Frobenius. A partial list of pioneers in quasi-Frobenius rings includes R. Brauer, K. Morita, T. Nakayama, C. J. Nesbitt, and R. M. Thrall.

== Definitions ==
A ring R is quasi-Frobenius if and only if R satisfies any of the following equivalent conditions:

1. R is Noetherian on one side and self-injective on one side.
2. R is Artinian on a side and self-injective on a side.
3. All right (or all left) R modules which are projective are also injective.
4. All right (or all left) R modules which are injective are also projective.

A Frobenius ring R is one satisfying any of the following equivalent conditions. Let J=J(R) be the Jacobson radical of R.

1. R is quasi-Frobenius and the socle $\mathrm{soc}(R_R)\cong R/J$ as right R modules.
2. R is quasi-Frobenius and $\mathrm{soc}(_R R)\cong R/J$ as left R modules.
3. As right R modules $\mathrm{soc}(R_R)\cong R/J$, and as left R modules $\mathrm{soc}(_R R)\cong R/J$.

For a commutative ring R, the following are equivalent:

1. R is Frobenius
2. R is quasi-Frobenius
3. R is a finite direct sum of local artinian rings which have unique minimal ideals. (Such rings are examples of "zero-dimensional Gorenstein local rings".)

A ring R is right pseudo-Frobenius if any of the following equivalent conditions are met:

1. Every faithful right R module is a generator for the category of right R modules.
2. R is right self-injective and is a cogenerator of Mod-R.
3. R is right self-injective and is finitely cogenerated as a right R module.
4. R is right self-injective and a right Kasch ring.
5. R is right self-injective, semilocal and the socle soc(R_{R}) is an essential submodule of R.
6. R is a cogenerator of Mod-R and is a left Kasch ring.

A ring R is right finitely pseudo-Frobenius if and only if every finitely generated faithful right R module is a generator of Mod-R.

== Thrall's QF-1,2,3 generalizations ==
In the seminal article (Thrall 1948), R. M. Thrall focused on three specific properties of (finite-dimensional) QF algebras and studied them in isolation. With additional assumptions, these definitions can also be used to generalize QF rings. A few other mathematicians pioneering these generalizations included K. Morita and H. Tachikawa.

Following (Anderson & Fuller 1992), let R be a left or right Artinian ring:

- R is QF-1 if all faithful left modules and faithful right modules are balanced modules.
- R is QF-2 if each indecomposable projective right module and each indecomposable projective left module has a unique minimal submodule. (I.e. they have simple socles.)
- R is QF-3 if the injective hulls E(R_{R}) and E(_{R}R) are both projective modules.

The numbering scheme does not necessarily outline a hierarchy. Under more lax conditions, these three classes of rings may not contain each other. Under the assumption that R is left or right Artinian however, QF-2 rings are QF-3. There is even an example of a QF-1 and QF-3 ring which is not QF-2.

== Nakayama permutations ==
T. Nakayama defined (Nakayama 41) quasi-Frobenius rings as Artinian rings with a Nakayama permutation.

For an Artinian ring, or a semiperfect ring $R$ in general, we can define a Nakayama permutation as follows:

Given a complete orthogonal set $e_1, \dots, e_m$ of local idempotents, we can assume ordering of this set in such a way that for some $n \le m$ the right modules $e_1 R, \dots, e_n R$ form a complete set of finitely generated projective modules. Then $\pi \in S_n$ is a Nakayama permutation of a semiperfect ring $R$ if and only if for each $k \le n$:

$$\begin{align}
\operatorname{soc}(e_k R) &\cong \operatorname{top}(e_{\pi(k)} R) && \text{(R)} \\
\operatorname{soc}(R e_{\pi(k)}) &\cong \operatorname{top}(R e_k). && \text{(L)}
\end{align}$$

In particular, a ring with a Nakayama permutation is a QF-2 Kasch ring. A ring is (left and right) pseudo-Frobenius if and only if it is a self-injective ring with a Nakayama permutation.

A quasi-Frobenius ring is Frobenius if its Nakayama permutation preserves multiplicities. That is, given an indecomposable decomposition of a right module $R_R$, the number of indecomposable summands isomorphic to $e_kR$ equals the number of indecomposable summands isomorphic $e_{\pi(k)} R$ for any $k \le n$. In particular, a basic quasi-Frobenius ring is a Frobenius ring.

== Examples ==
- Every Frobenius k algebra is a Frobenius ring.
- Every semisimple ring is quasi-Frobenius, since all modules are projective and injective. Even more is true however: semisimple rings are all Frobenius. This is easily verified by the definition, since for semisimple rings $\mathrm{soc}(R_R)=\mathrm{soc}(_R R)=R$ and J = rad(R) = 0.
- The quotient ring $\mathbb{Z} / n \mathbb{Z}$ is QF for any positive integer n>1.
- Commutative Artinian serial rings are all Frobenius, and in fact have the additional property that every quotient ring R/I is also Frobenius. It turns out that among commutative Artinian rings, the serial rings are exactly the rings whose (nonzero) quotients are all Frobenius.
- Many exotic PF and FPF rings can be found as examples in Faith & Page (1984)

== See also ==
- Quasi-Frobenius Lie algebra

== Notes ==
The definitions for QF, PF and FPF are easily seen to be categorical properties, and so they are preserved by Morita equivalence, however being a Frobenius ring is not preserved.

For one-sided Noetherian rings the conditions of left or right PF both coincide with QF, but FPF rings are still distinct.

A finite-dimensional algebra R over a field k is a Frobenius k-algebra if and only if R is a Frobenius ring.

QF rings have the property that all of their modules can be embedded in a free R module. This can be seen in the following way. A module M embeds into its injective hull E(M), which is now also projective. As a projective module, E(M) is a summand of a free module F, and so E(M) embeds in F with the inclusion map. By composing these two maps, M is embedded in F.

== Textbooks ==
- Anderson, Frank Wylie; Fuller, Kent R (1992), Rings and Categories of Modules, Berlin, New York: Springer-Verlag, ISBN 978-0-387-97845-1
- Faith, Carl; Page, Stanley (1984), FPF Ring Theory: Faithful modules and generators of Mod-$R$, London Mathematical Society Lecture Note Series No. 88, Cambridge University Press, doi:10.1017/CBO9780511721250, ISBN 0-521-27738-8, MR 0754181
- Lam, Tsit-Yuen (1999), Lectures on modules and rings, Graduate Texts in Mathematics No. 189, Berlin, New York: Springer-Verlag, doi:10.1007/978-1-4612-0525-8, ISBN 978-0-387-98428-5, MR 1653294
- Nicholson, W. K.; Yousif, M. F. (2003), Quasi-Frobenius rings, Cambridge University Press, ISBN 0-521-81593-2
