= Serial module =

In abstract algebra, a uniserial module M is a module over a ring R, whose submodules are totally ordered by inclusion. This means simply that for any two submodules N_{1} and N_{2} of M, either $N_1\subseteq N_2$ or $N_2\subseteq N_1$. A module is called a serial module if it is the direct sum of uniserial modules. A ring R is called a right uniserial ring if it is uniserial as a right module over itself, and likewise called a right serial ring if it is a right serial module over itself. Left uniserial and left serial rings are defined in a similar way, and are in general distinct from their right-sided counterparts.

An easy motivating example is the quotient ring $\mathbb{Z}/n\mathbb{Z}$ for any integer $n>1$. This ring is always serial, and is uniserial when n is a prime power.

The term uniserial has been used differently from the above definition: for clarification see below.

A partial alphabetical list of important contributors to the theory of serial rings includes the mathematicians Keizo Asano, I. S. Cohen, P.M. Cohn, Yu. Drozd, D. Eisenbud, A. Facchini, A.W. Goldie, Phillip Griffith, I. Kaplansky, V.V Kirichenko, G. Köthe, H. Kuppisch, I. Murase, T. Nakayama, P. Příhoda, G. Puninski, and R. Warfield.

Following the common ring theoretic convention, if a left/right dependent condition is given without mention of a side (for example, uniserial, serial, Artinian, Noetherian) then it is assumed the condition holds on both the left and right. Unless otherwise specified, each ring in this article is a ring with unity, and each module is unital.

== Properties of uniserial and serial rings and modules ==
It is immediate that in a uniserial R-module M, all submodules except M and 0 are simultaneously essential and superfluous. If M has a maximal submodule, then M is a local module. M is also clearly a uniform module and thus is directly indecomposable. It is also easy to see that every finitely generated submodule of M can be generated by a single element, and so M is a Bézout module.

It is known that the endomorphism ring End_{R} M is a semilocal ring which is very close to a local ring in the sense that End_{R} M has at most two maximal right ideals. If M is assumed to be Artinian or Noetherian, then End_{R} M is a local ring.

Since rings with unity always have a maximal right ideal, a right uniserial ring is necessarily local. As noted before, a finitely generated right ideal can be generated by a single element, and so right uniserial rings are right Bézout rings. A right serial ring R necessarily factors in the form $R = \oplus_{i=1}^n e_i R$ where each e_{i} is an idempotent element and e_{i}R is a local, uniserial module. This indicates that R is also a semiperfect ring, which is a stronger condition than being a semilocal ring.

Köthe showed that the modules of Artinian principal ideal rings (which are a special case of serial rings) are direct sums of cyclic submodules. Later, Cohen and Kaplansky determined that a commutative ring R has this property for its modules if and only if R is an Artinian principal ideal ring. Nakayama showed that Artinian serial rings have this property on their modules, and that the converse is not true

The most general result, perhaps, on the modules of a serial ring is attributed to Drozd and Warfield: it states that every finitely presented module over a serial ring is a direct sum of cyclic uniserial submodules (and hence is serial). If additionally the ring is assumed to be Noetherian, the finitely presented and finitely generated modules coincide, and so all finitely generated modules are serial.

Being right serial is preserved under direct products of rings and modules, and preserved under quotients of rings. Being uniserial is preserved for quotients of rings and modules, but never for products. A direct summand of a serial module is not necessarily serial, as was proved by Puninski, but direct summands of finite direct sums of uniserial modules are serial modules.

It has been verified that Jacobson's conjecture holds in Noetherian serial rings.

== Examples ==
Any simple module is trivially uniserial, and likewise semisimple modules are serial modules.

Many examples of serial rings can be gleaned from the structure sections above. Every valuation ring is a uniserial ring, and all Artinian principal ideal rings are serial rings, as is illustrated by semisimple rings.

More exotic examples include the upper triangular matrices over a division ring T_{n} D, and the group ring $\mathbb{F}[G]$ for some finite field of prime characteristic p and group G having a cyclic normal p-Sylow subgroup.

== Structure ==
This section will deal mainly with Noetherian serial rings and their subclass, Artinian serial rings. In general, rings are first broken down into indecomposable rings. Once the structure of these rings are known, the decomposable rings are direct products of the indecomposable ones. Also, for semiperfect rings such as serial rings, the basic ring is Morita equivalent to the original ring. Thus if R is a serial ring with basic ring B, and the structure of B is known, the theory of Morita equivalence gives that $R\cong \mathrm{End}_B(P)$ where P is some finitely generated progenerator B. This is why the results are phrased in terms of indecomposable, basic rings.

In 1975, Kirichenko and Warfield independently and simultaneously published analyses of the structure of Noetherian, non-Artinian serial rings. The results were the same however the methods they used were very different from each other. The study of hereditary, Noetherian, prime rings, as well as quivers defined on serial rings were important tools. The core result states that a right Noetherian, non-Artinian, basic, indecomposable serial ring can be described as a type of matrix ring over a Noetherian, uniserial domain V, whose Jacobson radical J(V) is nonzero. This matrix ring is a subring of M_{n}(V) for some n, and consists of matrices with entries from V on and above the diagonal, and entries from J(V) below.

Artinian serial ring structure is classified in cases depending on the quiver structure. It turns out that the quiver structure for a basic, indecomposable, Artinian serial ring is always a circle or a line. In the case of the line quiver, the ring is isomorphic to the upper triangular matrices over a division ring (note the similarity to the structure of Noetherian serial rings in the preceding paragraph). A complete description of structure in the case of a circle quiver is beyond the scope of this article, but can be found in (Puninski 2002). To paraphrase the result as it appears there: A basic Artinian serial ring whose quiver is a circle is a homomorphic image of a "blow-up" of a basic, indecomposable, serial quasi-Frobenius ring.

== A decomposition uniqueness property ==
Two modules U and V are said to have the same monogeny class, denoted $[U]_m = [V]_m$, if there exists a monomorphism $U\rightarrow V$ and a monomorphism $V\rightarrow U$. The dual notion can be defined: the modules are said to have the same epigeny class, denoted $[U]_e = [V]_e$, if there exists an epimorphism $U\rightarrow V$ and an epimorphism $V \rightarrow U$.

The following weak form of the Krull-Schmidt theorem holds. Let U_{1}, ..., U_{n}, V_{1}, ..., V_{t} be n + t non-zero uniserial right modules over a ring R. Then the direct sums $U_1 \oplus\dots\oplus U_n$ and $V_1 \oplus\dots\oplus V_t$ are isomorphic R-modules if and only if n = t and there exist two permutations $\sigma$ and $\tau$ of 1, 2, ..., n such that $[U_i]_m = [V_{\sigma(i)}]_m$ and $[U_i]_e = [V_{\tau(i)}]_e$ for every i = 1, 2, ..., n.

This result, due to Facchini, has been extended to infinite direct sums of uniserial modules by Příhoda in 2006. This extension involves the so-called quasismall uniserial modules. These modules were defined by Nguyen Viet Dung and Facchini, and their existence was proved by Puninski. The weak form of the Krull-Schmidt Theorem holds not only for uniserial modules, but also for several other classes of modules (biuniform modules, cyclically presented modules over serial rings, kernels of morphisms between indecomposable injective modules, couniformly presented modules.)

== Notes on alternate, similar and related terms ==
Right uniserial rings can also be referred to as right chain rings or right valuation rings. This latter term alludes to valuation rings, which are by definition commutative, uniserial domains. By the same token, uniserial modules have been called chain modules, and serial modules semichain modules. The notion of a catenary ring has "chain" as its namesake, but it is in general not related to chain rings.

In the 1930s, Gottfried Köthe and Keizo Asano introduced the term Einreihig (literally "one-series") during investigations of rings over which all modules are direct sums of cyclic submodules. For this reason, uniserial was used to mean "Artinian principal ideal ring" even as recently as the 1970s. Köthe's paper also required a uniserial ring to have a unique composition series, which not only forces the right and left ideals to be linearly ordered, but also requires that there be only finitely many ideals in the chains of left and right ideals. Because of this historical precedent, some authors include the Artinian condition or finite composition length condition in their definitions of uniserial modules and rings.

Expanding on Köthe's work, Tadashi Nakayama used the term generalized uniserial ring to refer to an Artinian serial ring. Nakayama showed that all modules over such rings are serial. Artinian serial rings are sometimes called Nakayama algebras, and they have a well-developed module theory.

Warfield used the term homogeneously serial module for a serial module with the additional property that for any two finitely generated submodules A and B, $A/J(A)\cong B/J(B)$ where J(−) denotes the Jacobson radical of the module. In a module with finite composition length, this has the effect of forcing the composition factors to be isomorphic, hence the "homogeneous" adjective. It turns out that a serial ring R is a finite direct sum of homogeneously serial right ideals if and only if R is isomorphic to a full n × n matrix ring over a local serial ring. Such rings are also known as primary decomposable serial rings.

== Textbooks ==
- Frank W. Anderson; Kent R. Fuller (1992), Rings and Categories of Modules, Springer, pp. 347–349, ISBN 0-387-97845-3
- Chatters, A. W.; Hajarnavis, C.R. (1980), Rings with chain conditions, Research Notes in Mathematics, vol. 44, Pitman, ISBN 978-0-273-08446-4
- Facchini, Alberto (1998), Endomorphism rings and direct sum decompositions in some classes of modules, Birkhäuser Verlag, ISBN 3-7643-5908-0
- Faith, Carl (1976), Algebra. II. Ring theory., Grundlehren der Mathematischen Wissenschaften, No. 191. Springer-Verlag
- Faith, Carl (1999), Rings and things and a fine array of twentieth century associative algebra, Mathematical Surveys and Monographs, 65. American Mathematical Society, ISBN 0-8218-0993-8
- Hazewinkel, Michiel; Gubareni, Nadiya; Kirichenko, V. V. (2004), Algebras, rings and modules. Vol. 1., Kluwer Academic Publishers, ISBN 1-4020-2690-0
- Puninski, Gennadi (2001a), Serial rings, Kluwer Academic Publishers, ISBN 0-7923-7187-9

== Primary Sources ==
- Eisenbud, David; Griffith, Phillip (1971), "The structure of serial rings", Pacific J. Math., 36: 109–121, doi:10.2140/pjm.1971.36.109
- Facchini, Alberto (1996), "Krull-Schmidt fails for serial modules", Trans. Amer. Math. Soc., 348 (11): 4561–4575, doi:10.1090/s0002-9947-96-01740-0
- Köthe, Gottfried (1935), "Verallgemeinerte Abelsche Gruppen mit hyperkomplexem Operatorenring. (German)", Math. Z., 39: 31–44, doi:10.1007/bf01201343
- Nakayama, Tadasi (1941), "On Frobeniusean algebras. II.", Annals of Mathematics, Second Series, 42 (1): 1–21, doi:10.2307/1968984, hdl:10338.dmlcz/140501, JSTOR 1968984
- Příhoda, Pavel (2004), "Weak Krull-Schmidt theorem and direct sum decompositions of serial modules of finite Goldie dimension", J. Algebra, 281: 332–341, doi:10.1016/j.jalgebra.2004.06.027
- Příhoda, Pavel (2006), "A version of the weak Krull-Schmidt theorem for infinite direct sums of uniserial modules", Comm. Algebra, 34 (4): 1479–1487, doi:10.1080/00927870500455049
- Puninski, G. T. (2002), "Artinian and Noetherian serial rings.", J. Math. Sci. (New York), 110: 2330–2347, doi:10.1023/A:1014906008243
- Puninski, Gennadi (2001b), "Some model theory over a nearly simple uniserial domain and decompositions of serial modules", J. Pure Appl. Algebra, 163 (3): 319–337, doi:10.1016/s0022-4049(00)00140-7
- Puninski, Gennadi (2001c), "Some model theory over an exceptional uniserial ring and decompositions of serial modules", Journal of the London Mathematical Society, 64 (2): 311–326, doi:10.1112/s0024610701002344
- Warfield, Robert B. Jr. (1975), "Serial rings and finitely presented modules.", J. Algebra, 37 (2): 187–222, doi:10.1016/0021-8693(75)90074-5
