= Goldie's theorem =

Result in ring theory

In mathematics, Goldie's theorem is a basic structural result in ring theory, proved by Alfred Goldie during the 1950s. What is now termed a right Goldie ring is a ring R that has finite uniform dimension (="finite rank") as a right module over itself, and satisfies the ascending chain condition on right annihilators of subsets of R.

Goldie's theorem states that the semiprime right Goldie rings are precisely those that have a semisimple Artinian right classical ring of quotients. The structure of this ring of quotients is then completely determined by the Artin–Wedderburn theorem.

In particular, Goldie's theorem applies to semiprime right Noetherian rings, since by definition right Noetherian rings have the ascending chain condition on all right ideals. This is sufficient to guarantee that a right-Noetherian ring is right Goldie. The converse does not hold: every right Ore domain is a right Goldie domain, and hence so is every commutative integral domain.

A consequence of Goldie's theorem, again due to Goldie, is that every semiprime principal right ideal ring is isomorphic to a finite direct sum of prime principal right ideal rings. Every prime principal right ideal ring is isomorphic to a matrix ring over a right Ore domain.

== Sketch of the proof ==
This is a sketch of the characterization mentioned in the introduction. It may be found in (Lam 1999, p.324).

- If R is a semiprime right Goldie ring, then it is a right order in a semisimple ring:
  - Essential right ideals of R are exactly those containing a regular element.
  - There are no non-zero nil ideals in R.
  - R is a right nonsingular ring.
  - From the previous observations, R is a right Ore ring, and so its right classical ring of quotients Q^{r} exists. Also from the previous observations, Q^{r} is a semisimple ring. Thus R is a right order in Q^{r}.
- If R is a right order in a semisimple ring Q, then it is semiprime right Goldie:
  - Any right order in a Noetherian ring (such as Q) is right Goldie.
  - Any right order in a Noetherian semiprime ring (such as Q) is itself semiprime.
  - Thus, R is semiprime right Goldie.
