= Divisible group =

Abelian group in which every element can, in some sense, be divided by positive integers

In mathematics, specifically in the field of group theory, a divisible group is an abelian group in which every element can, in some sense, be divided by positive integers, or more accurately, every element is an nth multiple for each positive integer n. Divisible groups are important in understanding the structure of abelian groups, especially because they are the injective abelian groups.

== Definition ==
An abelian group $(G, +)$ is divisible if, for every positive integer $n$ and every $g \in G$, there exists $y \in G$ such that $ny=g$. An equivalent condition is: for any positive integer $n$, $nG=G$, since the existence of $y$ for every $n$ and $g$ implies that $n G\supseteq G$, and the other direction $n G\subseteq G$ is true for every group. A third equivalent condition is that an abelian group $G$ is divisible if and only if $G$ is an injective object in the category of abelian groups; for this reason, a divisible group is sometimes called an injective group.

An abelian group is $p$-divisible for a prime $p$ if for every $g \in G$, there exists $y \in G$ such that $py=g$. Equivalently, an abelian group is $p$-divisible if and only if $pG=G$.

== Examples ==
- The rational numbers $\mathbb Q$ form a divisible group under addition.
- More generally, the underlying additive group of any vector space over $\mathbb Q$ is divisible.
- Every quotient of a divisible group is divisible. Thus, $\mathbb Q/\mathbb Z$ is divisible.
- The p-primary component $\mathbb Z[1/p]/\mathbb Z$ of $\mathbb Q/ \mathbb Z$, which is isomorphic to the p-quasicyclic group $\mathbb Z[p^\infty]$, is divisible.
- The multiplicative group of the complex numbers $\mathbb C^*$ is divisible.
- Every existentially closed abelian group (in the model theoretic sense) is divisible.

== Properties ==
- If a divisible group is a subgroup of an abelian group then it is a direct summand of that abelian group.
- Every abelian group can be embedded in a divisible group. Put another way, the category of abelian groups has enough injectives.
- Non-trivial divisible groups are not finitely generated.
- Further, every abelian group can be embedded in a divisible group as an essential subgroup in a unique way.
- An abelian group is divisible if and only if it is p-divisible for every prime p.
- Let $A$ be a ring. If $T$ is a divisible group, then $\mathrm{Hom}_{\mathbf{Z}\text{-Mod}} (A,T)$ is injective in the category of $A$-modules.

== Structure theorem of divisible groups ==
Let G be a divisible group. Then the torsion subgroup Tor(G) of G is divisible. Since a divisible group is an injective module, Tor(G) is a direct summand of G. So

$$G = \mathrm{Tor}(G) \oplus  G/\mathrm{Tor}(G).$$

As a quotient of a divisible group, G/Tor(G) is divisible. Moreover, it is torsion-free. Thus, it is a vector space over Q and so there exists a set I such that

$$G/\mathrm{Tor}(G) = \bigoplus_{i \in I} \mathbb Q = \mathbb Q^{(I)}.$$

The structure of the torsion subgroup is harder to determine, but one can show that for all prime numbers p there exists $I_p$ such that

$$(\mathrm{Tor}(G))_p = \bigoplus_{i \in I_p} \mathbb Z[p^\infty] = \mathbb Z[p^\infty]^{(I_p)},$$

where $(\mathrm{Tor}(G))_p$ is the p-primary component of Tor(G).

Thus, if P is the set of prime numbers,

$$G = \left(\bigoplus_{p \in \mathbf P} \mathbb Z[p^\infty]^{(I_p)}\right) \oplus \mathbb Q^{(I)}.$$

The cardinalities of the sets I and I_{p} for p ∈ P are uniquely determined by the group G.

== Injective envelope ==
As stated above, any abelian group A can be uniquely embedded in a divisible group D as an essential subgroup. This divisible group D is the injective envelope of A, and this concept is the injective hull in the category of abelian groups.

== Reduced abelian groups ==
An abelian group is said to be reduced if its only divisible subgroup is {0}. Every abelian group is the direct sum of a divisible subgroup and a reduced subgroup. In fact, there is a unique largest divisible subgroup of any group, and this divisible subgroup is a direct summand. This is a special feature of hereditary rings like the integers Z: the direct sum of injective modules is injective because the ring is Noetherian, and the quotients of injectives are injective because the ring is hereditary, so any submodule generated by injective modules is injective. The converse is a result of (Matlis 1958): if every module has a unique maximal injective submodule, then the ring is hereditary.

A complete classification of countable reduced periodic abelian groups is given by Ulm's theorem.

== Generalization ==
Several distinct definitions generalize divisible groups to divisible modules. The following definitions have been used in the literature to define a divisible module M over a ring R:

1. rM = M for all nonzero r in R. (It is sometimes required that r is not a zero-divisor, and some authors require that R is a domain.)
2. For every principal left ideal Ra, any homomorphism from Ra into M extends to a homomorphism from R into M. (This type of divisible module is also called principally injective module.)
3. For every finitely generated left ideal L of R, any homomorphism from L into M extends to a homomorphism from R into M.

The last two conditions are "restricted versions" of the Baer's criterion for injective modules. Since injective left modules extend homomorphisms from all left ideals to R, injective modules are clearly divisible in sense 2 and 3.

If R is additionally a domain then all three definitions coincide. If R is a principal left ideal domain, then divisible modules coincide with injective modules. Thus in the case of the ring of integers Z, which is a principal ideal domain, a Z-module (which is exactly an abelian group) is divisible if and only if it is injective.

If R is a commutative domain, then the injective R modules coincide with the divisible R modules if and only if R is a Dedekind domain.

== See also ==
- Injective object
- Injective module
- Pure subgroup
