= Nakayama's conjecture =

In mathematics, Nakayama's conjecture is a conjecture about Artinian rings, introduced by Nakayama (1958). The generalized Nakayama conjecture is an extension to more general rings, introduced by Auslander and Reiten (1975). Leuschke & Huneke (2004) proved some cases of the generalized Nakayama conjecture.

Nakayama's conjecture states that if all the modules of a minimal injective resolution of an Artin algebra R are injective and projective, then R is self-injective.
