= Socle =

Socle may refer to:

- Socle (mathematics), an algebraic object generated by minimal subobjects or by an eigenspace of an automorphism
- Socle (architecture), a plinth that supports a pedestal, statue, or column
