= Dense submodule =

In abstract algebra, specifically in module theory, a dense submodule of a module is a refinement of the notion of an essential submodule. If N is a dense submodule of M, it may alternatively be said that "N ⊆ M is a rational extension". Dense submodules are connected with rings of quotients in noncommutative ring theory. Most of the results appearing here were first established in (Johnson 1951), (Utumi 1956) and (Findlay & Lambek 1958).

It should be noticed that this terminology is different from the notion of a dense subset in general topology. No topology is needed to define a dense submodule, and a dense submodule may or may not be topologically dense in a module with topology.

== Definition ==
This article modifies exposition appearing in (Storrer 1972) and (Lam 1999, p. 272). Let R be a ring, and M be a right R-module with submodule N. For an element y of M, define

$$y^{-1}N = \{r\in R \mid yr\in N \}.$$

Note that the expression y^{−1} is only formal since it is not meaningful to speak of the module element y being invertible, but the notation helps to suggest that y⋅(y^{−1}N) ⊆ N. The set y ^{−1}N is always a right ideal of R.

A submodule N of M is said to be a dense submodule if, for all x and y in M with x ≠ 0, there exists an r in R such that xr ≠ 0 and yr is in N. In other words, using the introduced notation,

$$x(y^{-1}N) \neq \{0\}.$$

In this case, the relationship is denoted by

$$N\subseteq_d M.$$

Another equivalent definition is homological in nature: N is dense in M if and only if

$$\mathrm{Hom}_R (M/N,E(M)) = \{0\},$$

where E(M) is the injective hull of M.

== Properties ==
- It can be shown that N is an essential submodule of M if and only if for all y ≠ 0 in M, the set y⋅(y ^{−1}N) ≠ {0}. Clearly then, every dense submodule is an essential submodule.
- If M is a nonsingular module, then N is dense in M if and only if it is essential in M.
- A ring is a right nonsingular ring if and only if its essential right ideals are all dense right ideals.
- If N and N' are dense submodules of M, then so is N ∩ N' .
- If N is dense and N ⊆ K ⊆ M, then K is also dense.
- If B is a dense right ideal in R, then so is y^{−1}B for any y in R.

== Examples ==
- If x is a non-zerodivisor in the center of R, then xR is a dense right ideal of R.
- If I is a two-sided ideal of R, I is dense as a right ideal if and only if the left annihilator of I is zero, that is, $\ell\cdot \mathrm{Ann}(I)=\{0\}\,$. In particular in commutative rings, the dense ideals are precisely the ideals which are faithful modules.

== Applications ==
=== Rational hull of a module ===
Every right R-module M has a maximal essential extension E(M) which is its injective hull. The analogous construction using a maximal dense extension results in the rational hull Ẽ(M) which is a submodule of E(M). When a module has no proper rational extension, so that Ẽ(M) = M, the module is said to be rationally complete. If R is right nonsingular, then of course Ẽ(M) = E(M).

The rational hull is readily identified within the injective hull. Let S=End_{R}(E(M)) be the endomorphism ring of the injective hull. Then an element x of the injective hull is in the rational hull if and only if x is sent to zero by all maps in S which are zero on M. In symbols,

$$\tilde{E}(M) = \{x\in E(M) \mid \forall f\in S, f(M)=0 \implies f(x)=0\}\,$$

In general, there may be maps in S which are zero on M and yet are nonzero for some x not in M, and such an x would not be in the rational hull.

=== Maximal right ring of quotients ===
The maximal right ring of quotients can be described in two ways in connection with dense right ideals of R.

- In one method, Ẽ(R) is shown to be module-isomorphic to a certain endomorphism ring, and the ring structure is taken across this isomorphism to imbue Ẽ(R) with a ring structure, that of the maximal right ring of quotients. (Lam 1999, p. 366)
- In a second method, the maximal right ring of quotients is identified with a set of equivalence classes of homomorphisms from dense right ideals of R into R. The equivalence relation says that two functions are equivalent if they agree on a dense right ideal of R. (Lam 1999, p. 370)
