= Continuous module =

In mathematics, a continuous module is a module M such that every submodule of M is essential in a direct summand and every submodule of M isomorphic to a direct summand is itself a direct summand. The endomorphism ring of a continuous module is a clean ring.
