= Balanced module =

In the subfield of abstract algebra known as module theory, a right R module M is called a balanced module (or is said to have the double centralizer property) if every endomorphism of the abelian group M which commutes with all R-endomorphisms of M is given by multiplication by a ring element. Explicitly, for any additive endomorphism f, if fg = gf for every R endomorphism g, then there exists an r in R such that f(x) = xr for all x in M. In the case of non-balanced modules, there will be such an f that is not expressible this way.

In the language of centralizers, a balanced module is one satisfying the conclusion of the double centralizer theorem, that is, the only endomorphisms of the group M commuting with all the R endomorphisms of M are the ones induced by right multiplication by ring elements.

A ring is called balanced if every right R module is balanced. It turns out that being balanced is a left-right symmetric condition on rings, and so there is no need to prefix it with "left" or "right".

The study of balanced modules and rings is an outgrowth of the study of QF-1 rings by C.J. Nesbitt and R. M. Thrall. This study was continued in V. P. Camillo's dissertation, and later it became fully developed. The paper (Dlab & Ringel 1972) gives a particularly broad view with many examples. In addition to these references, K. Morita and H. Tachikawa have also contributed published and unpublished results. A partial list of authors contributing to the theory of balanced modules and rings can be found in the references.

== Examples and properties ==
Examples

- Semisimple rings are balanced.
- Every nonzero right ideal over a simple ring is balanced.
- Every faithful module over a quasi-Frobenius ring is balanced.
- The double centralizer theorem for right Artinian rings states that any simple right R module is balanced.
- The paper (Dlab & Ringel 1972) contains numerous constructions of nonbalanced modules.
- It was established in (Nesbitt & Thrall 1946) that uniserial rings are balanced. Conversely, a balanced ring which is finitely generated as a module over its center is uniserial.
- Among commutative Artinian rings, the balanced rings are exactly the quasi-Frobenius rings.

Properties

- Being "balanced" is a categorical property for modules, that is, it is preserved by Morita equivalence. Explicitly, if F(–) is a Morita equivalence from the category of R modules to the category of S modules, and if M is balanced, then F(M) is balanced.
- The structure of balanced rings is also completely determined in (Dlab & Ringel 1972), and is outlined in (Faith 1999, pp. 222–224).
- In view of the last point, the property of being a balanced ring is a Morita invariant property.
- The question of which rings have all finitely generated right R modules balanced has already been answered. This condition turns out to be equivalent to the ring R being balanced.
