= Depth of noncommutative subrings =

In ring theory and Frobenius algebra extensions, areas of mathematics, there is a notion of depth two subring or depth of a Frobenius extension. The notion of depth two is important in a certain noncommutative Galois theory, which generates Hopf algebroids in place of the more classical Galois groups, whereas the notion of depth greater than two measures the defect, or distance, from being depth two in a tower of iterated endomorphism rings above the subring. A more recent definition of depth of any unital subring in any associative ring is proposed (see below) in a paper studying the depth of a subgroup of a finite group as group algebras over a commutative ring.

== Definition and first examples ==
A unital subring $B \subseteq A$ has (or is) right depth two if there is a split epimorphism of natural A-B-bimodules from $A^n \rightarrow A \otimes_B A$ for some positive integer n; by switching to natural B-A-bimodules, there is a corresponding definition of left depth two. Here we use the usual notation $A^n = A \times \ldots \times A$ (n times) as well as the common notion, p is a split epimorphism if there is a homomorphism q in the reverse direction such that pq = identity on the image of p. (Sometimes the subring B in A is referred to as the ring extension A over B; the theory works as well for a ring homomorphism B into A, which induces right and left B-modules structures on A.) Equivalently, the condition for left or right depth two may be given in terms of a split monomorphism of bimodules where the domains and codomains above are reversed.

For example, let A be the group algebra of a finite group G (over any commutative base ring k; see the articles on group theory and group ring for the elementary definitions). Let B be the group (sub)algebra of a normal subgroup H of index n in G with coset representatives $g_1,\cdots,g_n$. Define a split A-B epimorphism p:$A^n \rightarrow A \otimes_B A$ by $p((a_1,\cdots,a_n)) = \sum_{i=1}^n a_i g_i^{-1} \otimes_B g_i$. It is split by the mapping $q: A \otimes_B A \rightarrow A^n$ defined by $q(a \otimes_B a') = (a \gamma_1(a'),\cdots,a\gamma_n(a'))$ where $\gamma_i(g) = \delta_{ij} g$ for g in the coset $g_jH$ (and extended linearly to a mapping A into B, a B-B-module homomorphism since H is normal in G): the splitting condition pq = the identity on $A \otimes_B A$ is satisfied. Thus B is right depth two in A.

As another example (perhaps more elementary than the first; see ring theory or module theory for some of the elementary notions), let A be an algebra over a commutative ring B, where B is taken to be in the center of A. Assume A is a finite projective B-module, so there are B-linear mapping $f_i: A \rightarrow B$ and elements $x_i \in A$ (i = 1,...,n) called a projective base for the B-module A if it satisfies $\sum_{i=1}^n x_i f_i(a) = a$ for all a in A. It follows that B is left depth two in A by defining $p(a_1,\cdots,a_n) = \sum_{i=1}^n x_i \otimes_B a_i$ with splitting map $q(a \otimes_B a') = (f_1(a)a',\cdots,f_n(a)a')$ as the reader may verify. A similar argument naturally shows that B is right depth two in A.

== Depth in relation to Hopf algebras ==
For a Frobenius algebra extension A | B (such as A and B group algebras of a subgroup pair of finite index) the two one-sided conditions of depth two are equivalent, and a notion of depth n > 2 makes sense via the right endomorphism ring extension iterated to generate a tower of rings (a technical procedure beyond the scope of this survey, although the first step, the endomorphism ring theorem, is described in the section on Frobenius extension under Frobenius algebra). For example, if B is a Hopf subalgebra of a finite-dimensional Hopf algebra, then B has depth two in A if and only if B is normal in A (i.e. invariant under the left and right adjoint actions of A). Since a group algebra is a Hopf algebra, the first example above illustrates the back implication of the theorem. Other examples come from the fact that finite Hopf-Galois extensions are depth two in a strong sense (the split epimorphism in the definition may be replaced by a bimodule isomorphism).

Let R be a Hopf subalgebra of a finite-dimensional Hopf algebra H. Let R° denote the maximal ideal of elements of R having counit value 0. Then R°H is a right ideal and coideal in H, and the quotient module Q = H/R°H is a right H-module coalgebra. For example, if H is a group algebra, then R is a subgroup algebra of H, and one shows as an exercise that Q is isomorphic to the permutation module on the right cosets. The 2013 paper referenced below proves that the depth of R in H is determined to the nearest even value by the depth of Q as an R-module (by restriction). The depth of Q as an R-module is defined in that paper to be the least positive integer n such that Q⊗⋅⋅⋅⊗Q (n times Q, tensor product of R-modules, diagonal action of R from the right) has the same constituent indecomposable modules as Q ⊗⋅⋅⋅⊗ Q (n+1 times Q) (not counting multiplicities, an entirely similar definition for depth of Q as an H-module with closely related results). As a consequence, the depth of R in H is finite if and only if its "generalized quotient module" Q represents an algebraic element in the representation ring (or Green ring) of R. This is the case for example if Q is a projective module, a generator H-module or if Q is a permutation module over a group algebra R (i.e., Q has a basis that is a G-set). In case H is a Hopf algebra that is a semisimple algebra, the depth of Q is the length of the descending chain of annihilator ideals in H of increasing tensor powers of Q, which stabilize on the maximal Hopf ideal within the annihilator ideal, Ann Q = { h in H such that Qh = 0 } (using a 1967 theorem of Rieffel).

== Depth in relation to finite-dimensional semisimple algebras and subgroups of finite groups ==
If M is the inclusion matrix (or incidence matrix of the Bratteli diagram) of finite-dimensional semisimple (complex) algebras B and A, the depth two condition on the subalgebra B in A is given by an inequality $MM^tM \leq nM$ for some positive integer n (and each corresponding entry). Denoting the left-hand side of this inequality by the power $M^3$ and similarly for all powers of the inclusion matrix M, the condition of being depth $m \geq 1$ on the subalgebra pair of semisimple algebras is: $M^{m+1} \leq n M^{m-1}$. (Notice that if M satisfies the depth m condition, then it satisfies the depth m+1 condition.) For example, a depth one subgroup H of a finite group G, viewed as group algebras CH in CG over the complex numbers C, satisfies the condition on the centralizer $G = H C_G(X)$ for each cyclic subgroup X in H (whence normal); e.g. H a subgroup in the center of G, or G = H x K. As another example, consider the group algebras $B = CS_2$ and $A = CS_3$, the order 2 and order 6 permutation groups on three letter a,b,c where the subgroup fixes c. The inclusion matrix may be computed in at least three ways via idempotents, via character tables or via Littlewood-Richardson rule coefficients and combinatorics of skew tableaux to be (up to permutation) the 2 by 3 matrix with top row 1,1,0 and bottom row 0,1,1, which has depth three after applying the definition.

In a 2011 article in the Journal of Algebra by R. Boltje, S. Danz and B. Kuelshammer, they provide a simplified and extended definition of the depth of any unital subring B of associative ring A to be 2n+1 if $A\otimes_B \cdots \otimes_B A$ (n+1 times A) is isomorphic to a direct summand in $\oplus_{i=1}^m A \otimes_B \cdots \otimes_B A$ (n times A) as B-B-bimodules for some positive integer m; similarly, B has depth 2n in A if the same condition is satisfied more strongly as A-B-bimodules (or equivalently for free Frobenius extensions, as B-A-bimodules). (This definition is equivalent to an earlier notion of depth in case A is a Frobenius algebra extension of B with surjective Frobenius homomorphism, for example A and B are complex semisimple algebras.) Again notice that a subring having depth m implies that it has depth m+1, so they let $d(B,A)$ denote the minimal depth. They then apply this to the group algebras of G and H over any commutative ring R.

They define a minimum combinatorial depth $d_c(H,G)$ of a subgroup H of a finite group G mimicking the definition of depth of a subring but using G-sets and G-set homomorphisms instead of modules and module homomorphisms. They characterize combinatorial depth n as a condition on the number of conjugates of H intersecting in G thereby showing that combinatorial depth is finite. In more detail, one defines an ascending chain of sets of subgroups of H starting with the zeroth stage singleton set of H, the first stage intersecting H by all its conjugate subgroups, and the nth stage is to intersect all subgroups of H in the (n−1)'st stage by all conjugates of H. Then the combinatorial depth of H in G is 2n if the nth stage subset is equal to the (n−1)'st stage subset. For example, H is a normal subgroup of G if and only if H has combinatorial depth two in G. The minimum combinatorial depth follows from taking n to be minimum, and a technical definition of odd combinatorial depth. For example, $d_c(H,G) = 1$ if and only if $G = H C_G(H)$ (i.e., G equals the product of H and its centralizer subgroup in G); in particular, H is normal in G. In general, the minimum depth $d(RH,RG)$ is shown to be bounded by $d_c(H,G)$, which in turn is bounded by twice the index of the normalizer of H in G.

== Galois theory for depth two extensions and a Main Theorem ==
Main classes of examples of depth two extensions are Galois extensions of algebras being acted upon by groups, Hopf algebras, weak Hopf algebras or Hopf algebroids; for example, suppose a finite group G acts by automorphisms on an algebra A, then A is a depth two extension of its subalgebra B of invariants if the action is G-Galois, explained in detail in the article on Frobenius algebra extension (briefly called Frobenius extensions).

Conversely, any depth two extension A | B has a Galois theory based on the natural action of $\mbox{End}\, {}_BA_B$ on A: denoting this endomorphism ring by S, one shows S is a left bialgebroid over the centralizer R (those a in A commuting with all b in B) with a Galois theory similar to that of Hopf-Galois theory. There is a right bialgebroid structure on the B-centralized elements T in $A \otimes_B A$ dual over R to S; certain endomorphism rings decompose as smash product, such as $\mbox{End}\, A_B \cong A \otimes_R S$, i.e. isomorphic as rings to the smash product of the bialgebroid S (or its dual) with the ring A it acts on. Something similar is true for T and $\mbox{End}\, A \otimes_B A_A$ (often called a theory of duality of actions, which dates back in operator algebras to the 1970s). If A | B is in addition to being depth two a Frobenius algebra extension, the right and left endomorphism rings are anti-isomorphic, which restricts to an antipode on the bialgebroid $\mbox{End}\, {}_BA_B$ satisfying axioms of a Hopf algebroid. There is the following relation with relative homological algebra: the relative Hochschild complex of A over B with coefficients in A, and cup product, is isomorphic as differential graded algebras to the Amitsur complex of the R-coring S (with group-like element the identity on A; see Brzezinski-Wisbauer for the definition of the Amitsur cochain complex with product).

The Galois theory of a depth two extension is not irrelevant to a depth n > 2 Frobenius extension since such a depth n extension embeds in a depth two extension in a tower of iterated endomorphism rings. For example, given a depth three Frobenius extension of ring A over subring B, one can show that the left multiplication monomorphism $\lambda: B \rightarrow \mbox{End}\, A_B, \ \lambda(b)(a) = ba$ has depth two.

The main theorem in this subject is the following based on algebraic arguments in two of the articles below, published in Advances in Mathematics, that are inspired from the field of operator algebras, subfactors: in particular, somewhat related to A. Ocneanu's definition of depth, his theory of paragroups, and the articles by W. Szymanski, Nikshych-Vainerman, R. Longo and others.

Main Theorem: Suppose an algebra A is a Frobenius extension of a subalgebra B having depth 2, a surjective Frobenius homomorphism and one-dimensional centralizer R, then A is Hopf-Galois extension of B.

The proof of this theorem is a reconstruction theorem, requiring the construction of a Hopf algebra as a minimum, but in most papers done by construction of a nondegenerate pairing of two algebras in the iterated endomorphism algebra tower above B in A, and then a very delicate check that the resulting algebra-coalgebra structure is a Hopf algebra (see for example the article from 2001 below); the method of proof is considerably simplified by the 2003 article cited below (albeit packaged into the definition of Hopf algebroid). The Hopf algebroid structure on the endomorphism ring S of the B-bimodule A (discussed above) becomes a Hopf algebra in the presence of the hypothesis that the centralizer $R = \{r \in A : br = rb \text{ for all } b \in B\}$ is one-dimensional. The action of an endomorphism on its space of definition is shown to be a Hopf-Galois action. The dual Hopf algebra T introduced above as well in the Hopf algebroid context and the dual left action becomes a right coaction that makes A a T-Galois extension of B. The condition that the Frobenius homomorphism map A onto all of B is used to show that B is precisely the invariant subalgebra of the Hopf-Galois action (and not just contained within). The condition that A be a Frobenius extension over B is not as important to the proof as the depth two hypothesis and might be avoided by imposing a progenerator module condition on A as a natural B-module.
