= V-ring (ring theory) =

A particular algebraic structure

In mathematics, a V-ring is a ring R such that every simple R-module is injective. The following three conditions are equivalent:

1. Every simple left (respectively right) R-module is injective.
2. The radical of every left (respectively right) R-module is zero.
3. Every left (respectively right) ideal of R is an intersection of maximal left (respectively right) ideals of R.

A commutative ring is a V-ring if and only if it is Von Neumann regular.
