= Essential monomorphism =

In mathematics, specifically category theory, an essential monomorphism is a monomorphism i in an abelian category C such that for a morphism f in C, the composition $fi$ is a monomorphism only when f is a monomorphism. Essential monomorphisms in a category of modules are those whose image is an essential submodule of the codomain. An injective hull of an object A is an essential monomorphism from A to an injective object.
