= Cosocle =

Mathematical term

In mathematics, the term cosocle (socle meaning pedestal in French) has several related meanings.

In group theory, a cosocle of a group G, denoted by Cosoc(G), is the intersection of all maximal normal subgroups of G. If G is a quasisimple group, then Cosoc(G) = Z(G).

In the context of Lie algebras, a cosocle of a symmetric Lie algebra is the eigenspace of its structural automorphism that corresponds to the eigenvalue +1. (A symmetric Lie algebra decomposes into the direct sum of its socle and cosocle.)

In the context of module theory, the cosocle of a module over a ring R is defined to be the maximal semisimple quotient of the module.

== See also ==
- Socle
- Radical of a module
