= Wolverhampton Grammar School =

Coordinates: 52.586°N 2.150°W

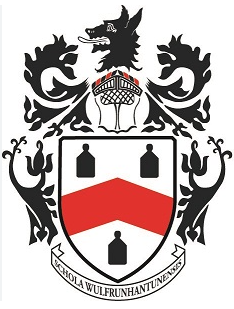

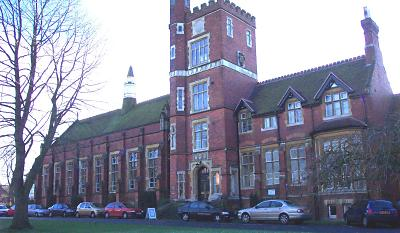

Location
- Compton Road; Wolverhampton, West Midlands, WV3 9RB; England

Information
- Type: Private day school Grammar school
- Established: 1512; 514 years ago
- Founder: Sir Stephen Jenyns
- Local authority: Wolverhampton
- Department for Education URN: 104411 Tables
- Head teacher: Nic Anderson
- Gender: Coeducational
- Age: 4 to 18
- Enrolment: 726
- Houses: Jenyns - Red, Nechells - Yellow, Moreton - Green, Offley - Blue
- Colours: Red, White and Black
- Alumni: Old Wulfrunians
- Website: http://www.wgs.org.uk/

Wolverhampton Grammar School is a co-educational private school in Wolverhampton, England.

== History ==
Initially a grammar school for boys, WGS was founded in 1512 by Sir Stephen Jenyns, a master of the ancient guild of Merchant Taylors, who was also Lord Mayor of London in the year of Henry VIII's coronation. Jenyns was born in the town of Wolverhampton circa 1448.

In 1875, the school moved to its present site on the Compton Road from its previous site on John Street in the centre of Wolverhampton.

In the late 1970s, the local authority required the school either to become a 6th form centre or a private, fee paying school. The governors decided to go private and the school admitted the first fee paying students in 1978. A bursary appeal was also launched to provide subsidised places.

In September 1984, after 472 years as an all-boys school, the school admitted girls to the sixth form and in other embraces of modernity was the largest single user of assisted places funds, with over 40% of pupils in the 1980s and early 1990s reliant upon assisted places funding.

In September 1992, the school became fully co-educational, admitting girls from the age of 11, a move seen as somewhat controversial at the time; however, other mixed grammar schools had existed for many years previously, while other single sex grammar schools had merged to continue as mixed grammar schools or mixed comprehensives. Unusually, Wolverhampton Girls High School has remained in existence alongside it, pressure for places at that school being eased by girls now being able to attend the grammar school.

The current head Nic Anderson, an Old Wulfrunian himself, replaced Alex Frazer and is the school's 35th head.

Over recent years the school has undergone development to improve facilities available to pupils. This included construction of a rock climbing wall, which replaced an Eton Fives court behind the sports centre. A new large extension to the music block was also completed in 2005, and officially opened by Robert Plant. In December 2007, a new block for the arts was opened on Merridale Lane, beyond Moreton's Piece, with a production of As You Like It and an exhibition by artist in residence Derek Jones. It houses a number of art classrooms on two storeys, a gallery space (The Viner Gallery) and a 150- to 200-seat studio theatre (The Hutton Theatre, named after the late headmaster Patrick Hutton).

In September 2010, the school added Year 6. In September 2011 Wolverhampton Grammar Junior School (WGJS) was opened on the school site, adding Year 3, 4 and 5. In 2021 the school added Reception, and Years 1 and 2.

The school marked its 500th anniversary in 2012.

== Notable alumni ==
Former pupils of the school are referred to as Old Wulfrunians.

- John Abernethy FRS (1764–1831), surgeon, and founder of the school of medicine at St Bartholomew's Hospital
- Thomas Attwood (1783–1856), founder of the Birmingham Political Union in 1829, which pushed for democratic reform, feted as a hero after the Great Reform Act 1832, later an MP for Birmingham
- Sir Arthur Benson (1907–1987), chief secretary to Central African Council, Governor of North Rhodesia 1954–59
- Sir Norman Brook, 1st Baron Normanbrook (1902–1967), head of the British Civil Service in the late 1950s and 1960s; described by the Oxford Dictionary of National Biography as "the great technician of cabinet government in the mid twentieth century", also chairman of the BBC Board of Governors 1963–67
- Sir William Congreve, 2nd Baronet (1772–1828), inventor and rocket designer
- Robert Felkin (1853–1926), medical missionary, ceremonial magician and member of the Hermetic Order of the Golden Dawn, author on Uganda and Central Africa, early anthropologist
- Alfred Goldie (1920–2005), professor of pure mathematics at the University of Leeds; author of Goldie's theorem
- Robert Jenrick (born 1982), Reform UK Member of Parliament for Newark since 2014 and Treasury Minister in the government of Theresa May
- Chris Kelly (born 1978), Conservative MP for Dudley South 2010-2015 and benefactor of West Bromwich Albion football club 2021–present
- Mervyn King, Baron King of Lothbury (born 1948), Governor of the Bank of England, 2003–13
- Augustus Edward Hough Love FRS (1863–1940), mathematician, developer of the theory of the Love Wave.
- Richard Meddings (born 1958), banker, executive chairman of TSB Bank
- Mark Moore (born 1961), headmaster of Clifton College
- Ralph Westwood Moore (1906–1953), headmaster of Harrow School
- Jacqui Oatley, female football commentator
- Aaron Rai (born 1995), golfer, winner of the 2026 PGA Championship
- Jon Raven (1940–2015), author of many books related to the Black Country, and folk musician
- John Rentoul (born 1958), journalist for The Independent
- Sathnam Sanghera (born 1976), The Times journalist and author
- Roger Squires (1932–2023), crossword compiler
- Sir David Wright GCMG (born 1944), British diplomat, ambassador to Japan, 1996–99
