= Radical of a module =

In mathematics, in the theory of modules, the radical of a module is a component in the theory of structure and classification. It is a generalization of the Jacobson radical for rings. In many ways, it is the dual notion to that of the socle soc(M) of M.

== Definition ==
Let $R$ be a ring and $M$ a left $R$-module. A submodule $N$ of $M$ is called maximal or cosimple if the quotient $M/N$ is a simple module. The radical of the module $M$ is the intersection of all maximal submodules of $M$,

$$\mathrm{rad}(M) = \bigcap\, \{N \mid N \mbox{ is a maximal submodule of } M\}$$

Equivalently,

$$\mathrm{rad}(M) = \sum\, \{S \mid S \mbox{ is a superfluous submodule of } M\}$$

These definitions have direct dual analogues for $\mathrm{soc}(M)$.

== Properties ==
- In addition to the fact that $\mathrm{rad}(M)$ is the sum of superfluous submodules, in a Noetherian module, $\mathrm{rad}(M)$ itself is a superfluous submodule.

In fact, if $M$ is finitely generated over a ring, then $\mathrm{rad}(M)$ itself is a superfluous submodule. This is because any proper submodule of $M$ is contained in a maximal submodule of $M$ when $M$ is finitely generated.

- A ring for which $\mathrm{rad}(M)=\{0\}$ for every right $R$-module $M$ is called a right V-ring.
- For any module $M$, $\mathrm{rad}(M/\mathrm{rad}(M))$ is zero.
- $M$ is a finitely generated module if and only if the cosocle $M/\mathrm{rad}(M)$ is finitely generated and $\mathrm{rad}(M)$ is a superfluous submodule of $M$.

== See also ==
- Socle (mathematics)
- Jacobson radical
