= Clean ring =

Algebraic structure generalizing Boolean rings

In mathematics, a clean ring is a ring in which every element can be written as the sum of a unit and an idempotent. A ring is a local ring if and only if it is clean and has no idempotents other than 0 and 1. The endomorphism ring of a continuous module is a clean ring. Every clean ring is an exchange ring. A matrix ring over a clean ring is itself clean. Every Boolean ring is trivially a clean ring, since every element is idempotent.
