= Double centralizer theorem =

In the branch of abstract algebra called ring theory, the double centralizer theorem can refer to any one of several similar results. These results concern the centralizer of a subring S of a ring R, denoted C_{R}(S) in this article. It is always the case that C_{R}(C_{R}(S)) contains S, and a double centralizer theorem gives conditions on R and S that guarantee that C_{R}(C_{R}(S)) is equal to S.

== Statements of the theorem ==
=== Motivation ===
The centralizer of a subring S of R is given by

$$\mathrm{C}_R(S)=\{r\in R \mid rs=sr \text{ for all } s\in S\}.\,$$

Clearly C_{R}(C_{R}(S)) ⊇ S, but it is not always the case that one can say the two sets are equal. The double centralizer theorems give conditions under which one can conclude that equality occurs.

There is another special case of interest. Let M be a right R module and give M the natural left E-module structure, where E is End(M), the ring of endomorphisms of the abelian group M. Every map m_{r} given by m_{r}(x) = xr creates an additive endomorphism of M, that is, an element of E. The map r → m_{r} is a ring homomorphism of R into the ring E, and we denote the image of R inside of E by R_{M}. It can be checked that the kernel of this canonical map is the annihilator Ann(M_{R}). Therefore, by an isomorphism theorem for rings, R_{M} is isomorphic to the quotient ring R/Ann(M_{R}). Clearly when M is a faithful module, R and R_{M} are isomorphic rings.

So now E is a ring with R_{M} as a subring, and C_{E}(R_{M}) may be formed. By definition one can check that C_{E}(R_{M}) = End(M_{R}), the ring of R module endomorphisms of M. Thus if it occurs that C_{E}(C_{E}(R_{M})) = R_{M}, this is the same thing as saying C_{E}(End(M_{R})) = R_{M}.

=== Central simple algebras ===
Perhaps the most common version is the version for central simple algebras, as it appears in (Knapp 2007, p.115):

Theorem: If A is a finite-dimensional central simple algebra over a field F and B is a simple subalgebra of A, then C_{A}(C_{A}(B)) = B, and moreover the dimensions satisfy

$$\mathrm{dim}_F(B)\cdot\mathrm{dim}_F(\mathrm{C}_A(B))=\mathrm{dim}_F(A).\,$$

=== Artinian rings ===
The following generalized version for Artinian rings (which include finite-dimensional algebras) appears in (Isaacs 2009, p.187). Given a simple R module U_{R}, we will borrow notation from the above motivation section including R_{U} and E=End(U). Additionally, we will write D=End(U_{R}) for the subring of E consisting of R-homomorphisms. By Schur's lemma, D is a division ring.

Theorem: Let R be a right Artinian ring with a simple right module U_{R}, and let R_{U}, D and E be given as in the previous paragraph. Then

$$R_U=\mathrm{C}_E(\mathrm{C}_E(R_U))\,$$.

Remarks

- In this version, the rings are chosen with the intent of proving the Jacobson density theorem. Notice that it only concludes that a particular subring has the centralizer property, in contrast to the central simple algebra version.
- Since algebras are normally defined over commutative rings, and all the involved rings above may be noncommutative, it's clear that algebras are not necessarily involved.
- If U is additionally a faithful module, so that R is a right primitive ring, then R_{U} is ring isomorphic to R.

=== Polynomial identity rings ===
In (Rowen 1980, p.154), a version is given for polynomial identity rings. The notation Z(R) will be used to denote the center of a ring R.

Theorem: If R is a simple polynomial identity ring, and A is a simple Z(R) subalgebra of R, then C_{R}(C_{R}(A)) = A.

Remarks

- This version can be considered to be "between" the central simple algebra version and the Artinian ring version. This is because simple polynomial identity rings are Artinian, but unlike the Artinian version, the conclusion still refers to all central simple subrings of R.

=== von Neumann Algebras ===
The Von Neumann bicommutant theorem states that a *-subalgebra A of the algebra of bounded operators B(H) on a Hilbert space H is a von Neumann algebra (i.e. is weakly closed) if and only if A = C_{B(H)}C_{B(H)}(A).

== Double centralizer property ==
A module M is said to have the double centralizer property or to be a balanced module if C_{E}(C_{E}(R_{M})) = R_{M}, where E = End(M) and R_{M} are as given in the motivation section. In this terminology, the Artinian ring version of the double centralizer theorem states that simple right modules for right Artinian rings are balanced modules.
