= Friedrich Karl Schmidt =

German mathematician

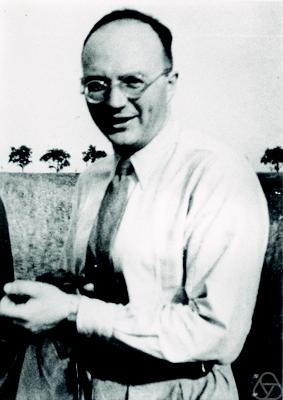
- Born: 22 September 1901; Düsseldorf, Rhine Province
- Died: 25 January 1977 (aged 75); Heidelberg, Baden-Württemberg
- Education: University of Freiburg
- Scientific career
- Fields: Mathematics
- Thesis: Allgemeine Körper im Gebiet der höheren Kongruenzen (1925)
- Doctoral advisor: Alfred Loewy
- Doctoral students: Robert Berger; Reinhardt Kiehl; Hans-Joachim Nastold; Chiungtze Tsen

Friedrich Karl Schmidt (22 September 1901 – 25 January 1977) was a German mathematician, who made notable contributions to algebra and number theory.

== Education ==
Schmidt studied from 1920 to 1925 in Freiburg and Marburg. In 1925 he completed his doctorate at the Albert-Ludwigs-Universität Freiburg under the direction of Alfred Loewy.

== Career ==
In 1927, he became a Privatdozent (lecturer) at the University of Erlangen, where he received his habilitation and in 1933 became a professor extraordinarius.

In 1933/34, he was a Dozent at the University of Göttingen, where he worked with Helmut Hasse.

Schmidt was then a professor ordinarius at the University of Jena from 1934 to 1945. During WW II, he was at the Deutsche Versuchsanstalt für Segelflug (German Research Station for Gliding) in Reichenhall.

He was a professor from 1946 to 1952 at Westfälischen Wilhelms-Universität in Münster and from 1952 to 1966 at the University of Heidelberg, where he retired as professor emeritus.

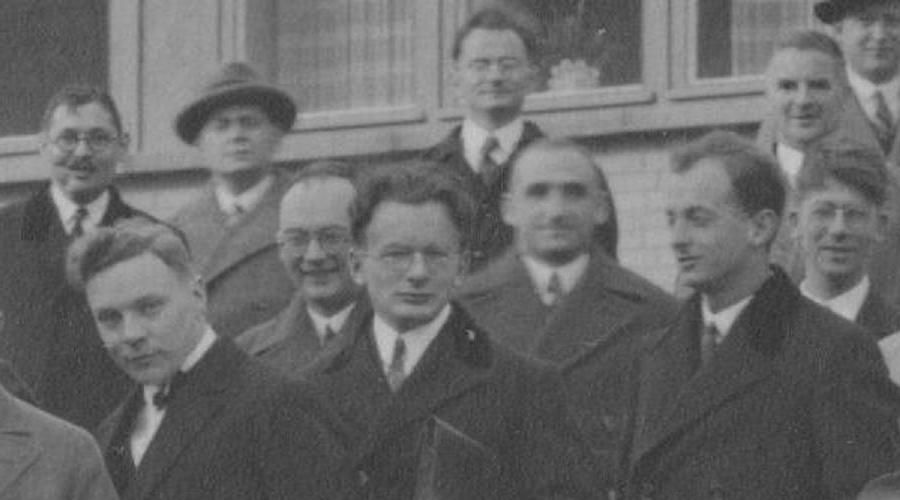
Mathematicians in 1930 in front of the Abbeanum in Jena, from left to right: Hubert Cremer, Heinrich Grell, Wolfgang Krull, Friedrich Karl Schmidt, Heinrich Heesch, Egon Ullrich, Friedrich Wilhelm Levi, Reinhold Baer, Theodor Pöschl, Friedrich Hund and ?Hermann Werner? (Werner from Jena).

In the mid-1930s Schmidt was on the editorial staff of Grundlehren der mathematischen Wissenschaften.

Schmidt was elected in 1954 a member of the Heidelberger Akademie der Wissenschaften and was made in 1968 an honorary doctor of the Free University of Berlin.

Schmidt is known for his contributions to the theory of algebraic function fields and in particular for his definition of a zeta function for algebraic function fields and his proof of the generalized Riemann–Roch theorem for algebraic function fields (where the base field can be an arbitrary perfect field). He also made contributions to class field theory and valuation theory.

The analogy between number fields and function fields has been realized since the latter part of the 19th century. Kronecker was already in some sense aware of some of its aspects. Dedekind originated a terminology in his study of number fields which he and Weber applied to function fields in one variable [Ded-W 1882]. Hensel-Landsberg then provided a first systematic book treatment of basic facts concerning these function fields [Hen-L 1902], using the Dedekind–Weber approach. Artin in his thesis [Art 1921] translated the Riemann hypothesis to the function field analogue (actually for quadratic fields). Several years later F. K. Schmidt treated general analytic number theory including the functional equation of the zeta function for function fields of arbitrary genus [Schm 1931].
