= Alfred Loewy =

German mathematician

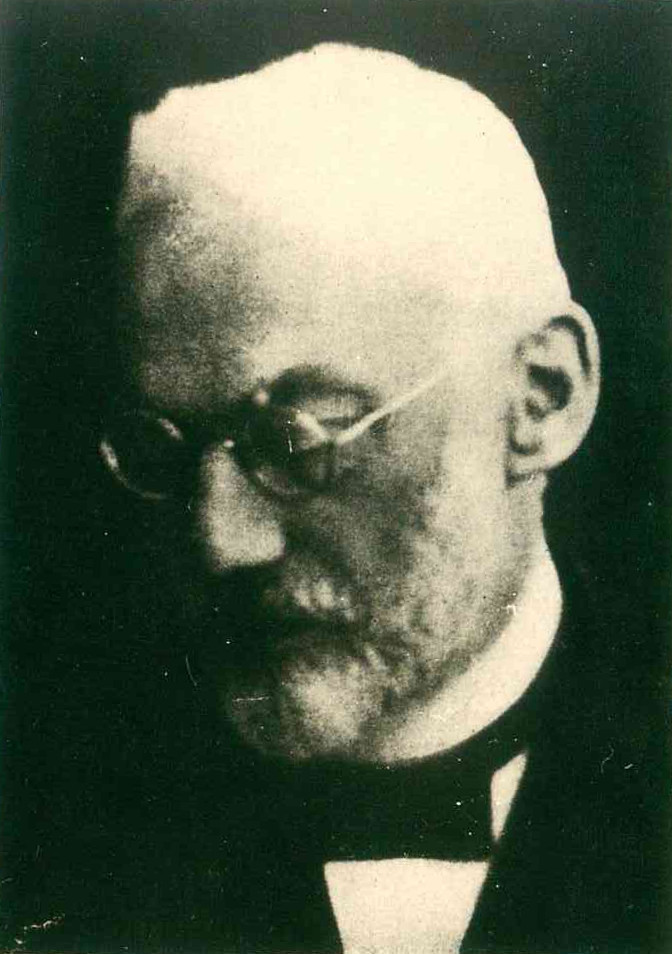
Alfred Loewy

Alfred Loewy (20 June 1873 – 25 January 1935) was a German mathematician who worked on representation theory. Loewy rings, Loewy length, Loewy decomposition and Loewy series are named after him.

His graduate students included Wolfgang Krull and Friedrich Karl Schmidt.

== Books ==
- Versicherungsmathematik, 19034th ed. 1924.
- Lehrbuch der Algebra, 1915
- Grundlagen der Arithmetik 1915
- Mathematik des Geld- und Zahlungsverkehrs, 1920
