= Hans-Joachim Nastold =

German mathematician

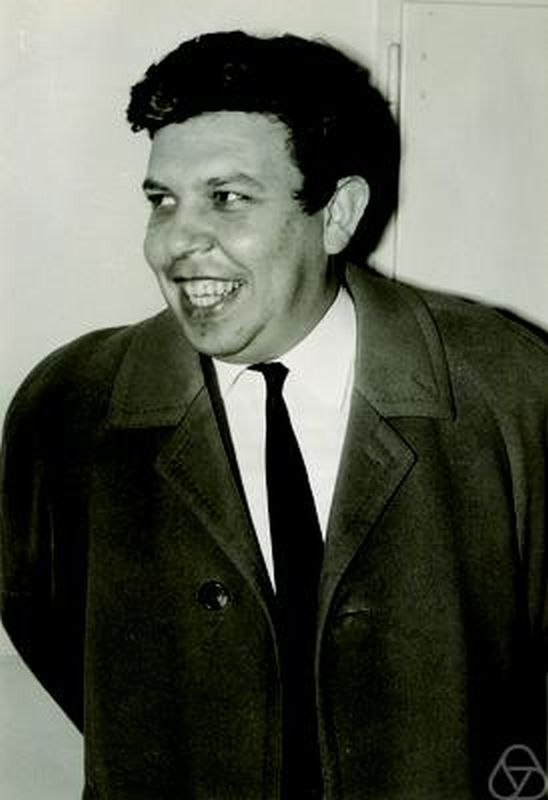
- Born: 13 July 1929; Stuttgart, Württemberg, German Empire
- Died: 26 January 2004 (aged 74); Münster, Northrhine-Westphalia, Germany
- Education: University of Heidelberg
- Scientific career
- Fields: Mathematics
- Doctoral advisor: Friedrich Karl Schmidt
- Doctoral students: Gerd Faltings; Christel Rotthaus

Hans-Joachim Nastold (13 July 1929 – 26 January 2004) was a German mathematician, who made notable contributions to algebra and number theory.

Born in Stuttgart, Nastold earned his Abitur in Göppingen. He attended the University of Heidelberg, earning his doctorate in 1957, under supervision of Friedrich Karl Schmidt.
