= Loewy ring =

In mathematics, a left (right) Loewy ring or left (right) semi-Artinian ring is a ring in which every non-zero left (right) module has a non-zero socle, or equivalently if the Loewy length of every left (right) module is defined. The concepts are named after Alfred Loewy.

== Loewy length ==
The Loewy length and Loewy series were introduced by Emil Artin, Cecil J. Nesbitt, and Robert M. Thrall (1944).

If M is a module, then define the Loewy series M_{α} for ordinals α by M_{0} = 0, M_{α+1}/M_{α} = socle(M/M_{α}), and M_{α} = ∪_{λ<α} M_{λ} if α is a limit ordinal. The Loewy length of M is defined to be the smallest α with M = M_{α}, if it exists.

== Semiartinian modules ==
${}_R M$ is a semiartinian module if, for all epimorphisms $M \rightarrow N$, where $N \neq 0$, the socle of $N$ is essential in $N.$

Note that if ${}_R M$ is an artinian module then ${}_R M$ is a semiartinian module. Clearly 0 is semiartinian.

If $0 \rightarrow M' \rightarrow M \rightarrow M'' \rightarrow 0$ is exact then $M'$ and $M''$ are semiartinian if and only if $M$ is semiartinian.

If $\{M_i\}_{i\in I}$ is a family of $R$-modules, then $\oplus_{i\in I}M_{i}$ is semiartinian if and only if $M_j$ is semiartinian for all $j \in I.$

== Semiartinian rings ==
$R$ is called left semiartinian if $_{R}R$ is semiartinian, that is, $R$ is left semiartinian if for any left ideal $I$, $R/I$ contains a simple submodule.

Note that $R$ left semiartinian does not imply that $R$ is left artinian.
