= Frobenius category =

Mathematical object

In category theory, a branch of mathematics, a Frobenius category is an exact category with enough projectives and enough injectives, where the classes of projectives and injectives coincide. It is an analog of a Frobenius algebra.

== Properties ==
The stable category of a Frobenius category is canonically a triangulated category.

== See also ==
- Dagger compact category
- Tannakian category
