= Christel Rotthaus =

American mathematician

- Education: Westfälische Wilhelms-Universität Münster
- Known for: Abstract algebra
- Awards: Fellow of the American Mathematical Society
- Scientific career
- Fields: Mathematics
- Workplaces: Michigan State University
- Thesis: Universell japanische und nichtausgezeichnete Ringe (1975)
- Doctoral advisor: Hans-Joachim Nastold

Christel Rotthaus is a professor of mathematics at Michigan State University. She is known for her research in commutative algebra.

== Career ==
Rotthaus received her Ph.D. from Westfälische Wilhelms-Universität Münster in 1975 under Hans-Joachim Nastold. Rotthaus now works at Michigan State University.

== Awards and honors ==
In 2012, Rotthaus became a fellow of the American Mathematical Society.

== Selected publications ==
- Brodmann, M.; Rotthaus, Ch.; Sharp, R. Y. On annihilators and associated primes of local cohomology modules. J. Pure Appl. Algebra 153 (2000), no. 3, 197–227.
- Heinzer, William; Rotthaus, Christel; Sally, Judith D. Formal fibers and birational extensions. Nagoya Math. J. 131 (1993), 1–38.
- Rotthaus, Christel. On rings with low-dimensional formal fibres. J. Pure Appl. Algebra 71 (1991), no. 2–3, 287–296.
- Rotthaus, Christel; Şega, Liana M. Some properties of graded local cohomology modules. J. Algebra 283 (2005), no. 1, 232–247.
- Rotthaus, Christel. On the approximation property of excellent rings. Invent. Math. 88 (1987), no. 1, 39–63.
