= Essential subgroup =

In mathematics, specifically group theory, a subgroup $S$ of a (typically abelian) group $G$ is called an essential subgroup if whenever $H$ is a non-trivial subgroup of $G$, the intersection of $S$ and $H$ is non-trivial; that is, $S\cap H\neq \{e\}$, where $e$ is the group's identity. The concept has been generalized to essential submodules.
