= Existentially closed model =

In model theory, a branch of mathematical logic, the notion of an existentially closed model (or existentially complete model) of a theory generalizes the notions of algebraically closed fields (for the theory of fields), real closed fields (for the theory of ordered fields), existentially closed groups (for the theory of groups), and dense linear orders without endpoints (for the theory of linear orders).

== Definition ==
A substructure M of a structure N is said to be existentially closed in (or existentially complete in) $N$ if for every quantifier-free formula φ(x_{1},…,x_{n},y_{1},…,y_{n}) and all elements b_{1},…,b_{n} of M such that φ(x_{1},…,x_{n},b_{1},…,b_{n}) is realized in N, then φ(x_{1},…,x_{n},b_{1},…,b_{n}) is also realized in M. In other words: If there is a tuple a_{1},…,a_{n} in N such that φ(a_{1},…,a_{n},b_{1},…,b_{n}) holds in N, then such a tuple also exists in M. This notion is often denoted $M \prec_1 N$.

A model M of a theory T is called existentially closed in T if it is existentially closed in every superstructure N that is itself a model of T. More generally, a structure M is called existentially closed in a class K of structures (in which it is contained as a member) if M is existentially closed in every superstructure N that is itself a member of K.

The existential closure in K of a member M of K, when it exists, is, up to isomorphism, the least existentially closed superstructure of M. More precisely, it is any extensionally closed superstructure M^{∗} of M such that for every existentially closed superstructure N of M, M^{∗} is isomorphic to a substructure of N via an isomorphism that is the identity on M.

== Examples ==
Let σ = (+,×,0,1) be the signature of fields, i.e. + and × are binary function symbols and 0 and 1 are constant symbols. Let K be the class of structures of signature σ that are fields. If A is a subfield of B, then A is existentially closed in B if and only if every system of polynomials over A that has a solution in B also has a solution in A. It follows that the existentially closed members of K are exactly the algebraically closed fields.

Similarly in the class of ordered fields, the existentially closed structures are the real closed fields. In the class of linear orders, the existentially closed structures are those that are dense without endpoints, while the existential closure of any countable (including empty) linear order is, up to isomorphism, the countable dense total order without endpoints, namely the order type of the rationals.

== See also ==
- Tarski-Vaught test
