= Ore condition =

In mathematics, in the area of algebra known as ring theory, the Ore condition is a condition introduced by Øystein Ore, in connection with the question of extending beyond commutative rings the construction of a field of fractions, or more generally localization of a ring. The right Ore condition for a multiplicatively closed subset S of a ring R is that for r ∈ R and s ∈ S, the intersection rS ∩ sR ≠ ∅. A (non-commutative) domain for which the set of non-zero elements satisfies the right Ore condition is called a right Ore domain. The left case is defined similarly.

== General idea ==
The goal is to construct the right ring of fractions R[S^{−1}] with respect to a multiplicative subset S. In other words, we want to work with elements of the form as^{−1} and have a ring structure on the set R[S^{−1}]. The problem is that there is no obvious interpretation of the product (as^{−1})(bt^{−1}); indeed, we need a method to "move" s^{−1} past b. This means that we need to be able to rewrite s^{−1}b as a product b_{1}s_{1}^{−1}. Suppose s^{−1}b = b_{1}s_{1}^{−1} then multiplying on the left by s and on the right by s_{1}, we get bs_{1} = sb_{1}. Hence we see the necessity, for a given a and s, of the existence of a_{1} and s_{1} with s_{1} ≠ 0 and such that as_{1} = sa_{1}.

== Application ==
Since it is well known that each integral domain is a subring of a field of fractions (via an embedding) in such a way that every element is of the form rs^{−1} with s nonzero, it is natural to ask if the same construction can take a noncommutative domain and associate a division ring (a noncommutative field) with the same property. It turns out that the answer is sometimes "no", that is, there are domains which do not have an analogous "right division ring of fractions".

For every right Ore domain R, there is a unique (up to natural R-isomorphism) division ring D containing R as a subring such that every element of D is of the form rs^{−1} for r in R and s nonzero in R. Such a division ring D is called a ring of right fractions of R, and R is called a right order in D. The notion of a ring of left fractions and left order are defined analogously, with elements of D being of the form s^{−1}r.

It is important to remember that the definition of R being a right order in D includes the condition that D must consist entirely of elements of the form rs^{−1}. Any domain satisfying one of the Ore conditions can be considered a subring of a division ring; however, this does not automatically mean R is a left order in D, since it is possible D has an element which is not of the form s^{−1}r. Thus it is possible for R to be a right-not-left Ore domain. Intuitively, the condition that all elements of D be of the form rs^{−1} says that R is a "big" R-submodule of D. In fact the condition ensures R_{R} is an essential submodule of D_{R}. Lastly, there is even an example of a domain in a division ring which satisfies neither Ore condition (see examples below).

Another natural question is: "When is a subring of a division ring right Ore?" One characterization is that a subring R of a division ring D is a right Ore domain if and only if D is a flat left R-module (Lam 2007, Ex. 10.20).

A different, stronger version of the Ore conditions is usually given for the case where R is not a domain, namely that there should be a common multiple

c = au = bv

with u, v not zero divisors. In this case, Ore's theorem guarantees the existence of an over-ring called the (right or left) classical ring of quotients.

== Examples ==
Commutative domains are automatically Ore domains, since for nonzero a and b, ab is nonzero in aR ∩ bR. Right Noetherian domains, such as right principal ideal domains, are also known to be right Ore domains. Even more generally, Alfred Goldie proved that a domain R is right Ore if and only if R_{R} has finite uniform dimension. It is also true that right Bézout domains are right Ore.

A subdomain of a division ring which is not right or left Ore: If F is any field, and $G = \langle x,y \rangle\,$ is the free monoid on two symbols x and y, then the monoid ring $F[G]\,$ does not satisfy any Ore condition, but it is a free ideal ring and thus indeed a subring of a division ring, by (Cohn 1995, Cor 4.5.9). Note that Cohn uses "field" to mean skew field.

== Multiplicative sets ==
The Ore condition can be generalized to other multiplicative subsets, and is presented in textbook form in (Lam 1999, §10) and (Lam 2007, §10). A subset S of a ring R is called a right denominator set if it satisfies the following three conditions for every a, b in R, and s, t in S:

1. st in S; (The set S is multiplicatively closed.)
2. aS ∩ sR is not empty; (The set S is right permutable.)
3. If sa = 0, then there is some u in S with au = 0; (The set S is right reversible.)

If S is a right denominator set, then one can construct the ring of right fractions RS^{−1} similarly to the commutative case. If S is taken to be the set of regular elements (those elements a in R such that if b in R is nonzero, then ab and ba are nonzero), then the right Ore condition is simply the requirement that S be a right denominator set.

Many properties of commutative localization hold in this more general setting. If S is a right denominator set for a ring R, then the left R-module RS^{−1} is flat. Furthermore, if M is a right R-module, then the S-torsion, tor_{S}(M) = { m in M : ms = 0 for some s in S }, is an R-submodule isomorphic to Tor_{1}(M, RS^{−1}), and the module M ⊗_{R} RS^{−1} is naturally isomorphic to a module MS^{−1} consisting of "fractions" as in the commutative case.
