= Nakayama algebra =

In mathematics, a Nakayama algebra or generalized uniserial algebra is an algebra such that each left or right indecomposable projective module has a unique composition series. They were studied by Tadasi Nakayama (1940) who called them "generalized uni-serial rings". These algebras were further studied by Herbert Kupisch (1959) and later by Ichiro Murase (1963-64), by Kent Ralph Fuller (1968) and by Idun Reiten (1982).

An example of a Nakayama algebra is k[x]/(x^{n}) for k a field and n a positive integer.

Current usage of uniserial differs slightly: an explanation of the difference appears here.
