= Socle (mathematics) =

In mathematics, the term socle has several related meanings.

== Socle of a group ==
In the context of group theory, the socle of a group G, denoted soc(G), is the subgroup generated by the minimal normal subgroups of G. It can happen that a group has no minimal non-trivial normal subgroup (that is, every non-trivial normal subgroup properly contains another such subgroup) and in that case the socle is defined to be the subgroup generated by the identity. The socle is a direct product of minimal normal subgroups.

As an example, consider the cyclic group Z_{12} with generator u, which has two minimal normal subgroups, one generated by u^{4} (which gives a normal subgroup with 3 elements) and the other by u^{6} (which gives a normal subgroup with 2 elements). Thus the socle of Z_{12} is the group generated by u^{4} and u^{6}, which is just the group generated by u^{2}.

The socle is a characteristic subgroup, and hence a normal subgroup. It is not necessarily transitively normal, however.

If a group G is a finite solvable group, then the socle can be expressed as a product of elementary abelian p-groups. Thus, in this case, it is just a product of copies of Z/pZ for various p, where the same p may occur multiple times in the product.

== Socle of a module ==
In the context of module theory and ring theory the socle of a module $M$ over a ring $R$ is defined to be the sum of the minimal nonzero submodules of $M$. It can be considered as a dual notion to that of the radical of a module. In set notation,

$$\mathrm{soc}(M) = \sum_{N \text{ is a simple submodule of }M} N.$$

Equivalently,

$$\mathrm{soc}(M) = \bigcap_{E \text{ is an essential submodule of }M} E.$$

The socle of a ring $R$ can refer to one of two sets in the ring. Considering $R$ as a right $R$-module, $\mathrm{soc}(R_R)$ is defined, and considering $R$ as a left $R$-module, $\mathrm{soc}(_RR)$ is defined. Both of these socles are ring ideals, and it is known they are not necessarily equal.

- If $M$ is an Artinian module, $\mathrm{soc}(M)$ is itself an essential submodule of $M$.

In fact, if $M$ is a semiartinian module, then $\mathrm{soc}(M)$ is itself an essential submodule of $M$. Additionally, if $M$ is a non-zero module over a left semi-Artinian ring, then $\mathrm{soc}(M)$ is itself an essential submodule of $M$. This is because any non-zero module over a left semi-Artinian ring is a semiartinian module.

- A module is semisimple if and only if $\mathrm{soc}(M)=M$. Rings for which $\mathrm{soc}(M)=M$ for all module $M$ are precisely semisimple rings.
- $\mathrm{soc}(\mathrm{soc}(M))=\mathrm{soc}(M)$.
- $M$ is a finitely cogenerated module if and only if $\mathrm{soc}(M)$ is finitely generated and $\mathrm{soc}(M)$ is an essential submodule of $M$.
- Since the sum of semisimple modules is semisimple, the socle of a module could also be defined as the unique maximal semisimple submodule.
- From the definition of $\mathrm{rad}(R)$, it is easy to see that $\mathrm{rad}(R)$ annihilates $\mathrm{soc}(R)$. If $R$ is a finite-dimensional unital algebra and $M$ a finitely generated $R$-module then the socle consists precisely of the elements annihilated by the Jacobson radical of $R$.

== Socle of a Lie algebra ==
In the context of Lie algebras, a socle of a symmetric Lie algebra is the eigenspace of its structural automorphism that corresponds to the eigenvalue −1. (A symmetric Lie algebra decomposes into the direct sum of its socle and cosocle.)

== See also ==
- Injective hull
- Radical of a module
- Cosocle
