= Uniform module =

In abstract algebra, a module is called a uniform module if the intersection of any two nonzero submodules is nonzero. This is equivalent to saying that every nonzero submodule of M is an essential submodule. A ring may be called a right (left) uniform ring if it is uniform as a right (left) module over itself.

Alfred Goldie used the notion of uniform modules to construct a measure of dimension for modules, now known as the uniform dimension (or Goldie dimension) of a module. Uniform dimension generalizes some, but not all, aspects of the notion of the dimension of a vector space. Finite uniform dimension was a key assumption for several theorems by Goldie, including Goldie's theorem, which characterizes which rings are right orders in a semisimple ring. Modules of finite uniform dimension generalize both Artinian modules and Noetherian modules.

In the literature, uniform dimension is also referred to as simply the dimension of a module or the rank of a module. Uniform dimension should not be confused with the related notion, also due to Goldie, of the reduced rank of a module.

== Properties and examples of uniform modules ==
Being a uniform module is not usually preserved by direct products or quotient modules. The direct sum of two nonzero uniform modules always contains two submodules with intersection zero, namely the two original summand modules. If N_{1} and N_{2} are proper submodules of a uniform module M and neither submodule contains the other, then $M/(N_1\cap N_2)$ fails to be uniform, as

$$N_1/(N_1\cap N_2)\cap N_2/(N_1\cap N_2)=\{0\}.$$

Uniserial modules are uniform, and uniform modules are necessarily directly indecomposable. Any commutative domain is a uniform ring, since if a and b are nonzero elements of two ideals, then the product ab is a nonzero element in the intersection of the ideals.

== Uniform dimension of a module ==
The following theorem makes it possible to define a dimension on modules using uniform submodules. It is a module version of a vector space theorem:

Theorem: If U_{i} and V_{j} are members of a finite collection of uniform submodules of a module M such that $\oplus_{i=1}^nU_i$ and $\oplus_{i=1}^mV_i$ are both essential submodules of M, then n = m.

The uniform dimension of a module M, denoted u.dim(M), is defined to be n if there exists a finite set of uniform submodules U_{i} such that $\oplus_{i=1}^nU_i$ is an essential submodule of M. The preceding theorem ensures that this n is well defined. If no such finite set of submodules exists, then u.dim(M) is defined to be ∞. When speaking of the uniform dimension of a ring, it is necessary to specify whether u.dim(R_{R}) or rather u.dim(_{R}R) is being measured. It is possible to have two different uniform dimensions on the opposite sides of a ring.

If N is a submodule of M, then u.dim(N) ≤ u.dim(M) with equality exactly when N is an essential submodule of M. In particular, M and its injective hull E(M) always have the same uniform dimension. It is also true that u.dim(M) = n if and only if E(M) is a direct sum of n indecomposable injective modules.

It can be shown that u.dim(M) = ∞ if and only if M contains an infinite direct sum of nonzero submodules. Thus if M is either Noetherian or Artinian, M has finite uniform dimension. If M has finite composition length k, then u.dim(M) ≤ k with equality exactly when M is a semisimple module. (Lam 1999)

A standard result is that a right Noetherian domain is a right Ore domain. In fact, we can recover this result from another theorem attributed to Goldie, which states that the following three conditions are equivalent for a domain D:

- D is right Ore
- u.dim(D_{D}) = 1
- u.dim(D_{D}) < ∞

== Hollow modules and co-uniform dimension ==
The dual notion of a uniform module is that of a hollow module: a module M is said to be hollow if, when N_{1} and N_{2} are submodules of M such that $N_1+N_2=M$, then either N_{1} = M or N_{2} = M. Equivalently, one could also say that every proper submodule of M is a superfluous submodule.

These modules also admit an analogue of uniform dimension, called co-uniform dimension, corank, hollow dimension or dual Goldie dimension. Studies of hollow modules and co-uniform dimension were conducted in (Fleury 1974), (Reiter 1981), (Takeuchi 1976), (Varadarajan 1979) and (Miyashita 1966). The reader is cautioned that Fleury explored distinct ways of dualizing Goldie dimension. Varadarajan, Takeuchi and Reiter's versions of hollow dimension are arguably the more natural ones. Grzeszczuk and Puczylowski in (Grezeszcuk & Puczylowski 1984) gave a definition of uniform dimension for modular lattices such that the hollow dimension of a module was the uniform dimension of its dual lattice of submodules.

It is always the case that a finitely cogenerated module has finite uniform dimension. This raises the question: does a finitely generated module have finite hollow dimension? The answer turns out to be no: it was shown in (Sarath & Varadarajan 1979) that if a module M has finite hollow dimension, then M/J(M) is a semisimple, Artinian module. There are many rings with unity for which R/J(R) is not semisimple Artinian, and given such a ring R, R itself is finitely generated but has infinite hollow dimension.

Sarath and Varadarajan showed later, that M/J(M) being semisimple Artinian is also sufficient for M to have finite hollow dimension provided J(M) is a superfluous submodule of M. This shows that the rings R with finite hollow dimension either as a left or right R-module are precisely the semilocal rings.

An additional corollary of Varadarajan's result is that R_{R} has finite hollow dimension exactly when _{R}R does. This contrasts the finite uniform dimension case, since it is known a ring can have finite uniform dimension on one side and infinite uniform dimension on the other.

== Textbooks ==
- Lam, Tsit-Yuen (1999), Lectures on modules and rings, Graduate Texts in Mathematics, vol. 189, Berlin, New York: Springer-Verlag, doi:10.1007/978-1-4612-0525-8, ISBN 978-0-387-98428-5, MR 1653294

== Primary sources ==
- Fleury, Patrick (1974), "A note on dualizing Goldie dimension", Canadian Mathematical Bulletin, 17 (4): 511–517, doi:10.4153/cmb-1974-090-0
- Goldie, A. W. (1958), "The structure of prime rings under ascending chain conditions", Proc. London Math. Soc., Series 3, 8 (4): 589–608, doi:10.1112/plms/s3-8.4.589, ISSN 0024-6115, MR 0103206
- Goldie, A. W. (1960), "Semi-prime rings with maximum condition", Proc. London Math. Soc., Series 3, 10: 201–220, doi:10.1112/plms/s3-10.1.201, ISSN 0024-6115, MR 0111766
- Grezeszcuk, P.; Puczylowski, E. (1984), "On Goldie and dual Goldie dimension", Journal of Pure and Applied Algebra, 31 (1–3): 47–55, doi:10.1016/0022-4049(84)90075-6
- Hanna, A.; Shamsuddin, A. (1984), Duality in the category of modules: Applications, Reinhard Fischer, ISBN 978-3889270177
- Miyashita, Y. (1966), "Quasi-projective modules, perfect modules, and a theorem for modular lattices", J. Fac. Sci. Hokkaido Ser. I, 19: 86–110, MR 0213390
- Reiter, E. (1981), "A dual to the Goldie ascending chain condition on direct sums of submodules", Bull. Calcutta Math. Soc., 73: 55–63
- Sarath, B.; Varadarajan, K. (1979), "Dual Goldie dimension II", Communications in Algebra, 7 (17): 1885–1899, doi:10.1080/00927877908822434
- Takeuchi, T. (1976), "On cofinite-dimensional modules.", Hokkaido Mathematical Journal, 5 (1): 1–43, doi:10.14492/hokmj/1381758746, ISSN 0385-4035, MR 0213390
- Varadarajan, K. (1979), "Dual Goldie dimension", Comm. Algebra, 7 (6): 565–610, doi:10.1080/00927877908822364, ISSN 0092-7872, MR 0524269
