= Endomorphism ring =

Endomorphism algebra of an abelian group

In mathematics, the endomorphisms of an abelian group X form a ring. This ring is called the endomorphism ring of X, denoted by End(X); the set of all homomorphisms of X into itself. Addition of endomorphisms arises naturally in a pointwise manner and multiplication via endomorphism composition. Using these operations, the set of endomorphisms of an abelian group forms a (unital) ring, with the zero map $0: x \mapsto 0$ as additive identity and the identity map $1: x \mapsto x$ as multiplicative identity.

The functions involved are restricted to what is defined as a homomorphism in the context, which depends upon the category of the object under consideration. The endomorphism ring consequently encodes several internal properties of the object. As the endomorphism ring is often an algebra over some ring R, this may also be called the endomorphism algebra.

An abelian group is the same thing as a module over the ring of integers, which is the initial object in the category of rings. In a similar fashion, if R is any commutative ring, the endomorphisms of an R-module form an algebra over R by the same axioms and derivation. In particular, if R is a field, its modules M are vector spaces and the endomorphism ring of each is an algebra over the field R.

== Description ==
Let (A, +) be an abelian group and we consider the group homomorphisms from A into A. Then addition of two such homomorphisms may be defined pointwise to produce another group homomorphism. Explicitly, given two such homomorphisms f and g, the sum of f and g is the homomorphism f + g : x ↦ f(x) + g(x). Under this operation End(A) is an abelian group. With the additional operation of composition of homomorphisms, End(A) is a ring with multiplicative identity. This composition is explicitly fg : x ↦ f(g(x)). The multiplicative identity is the identity homomorphism on A. The additive inverses are the pointwise inverses.

If the set A does not form an abelian group, then the above construction is not necessarily well-defined, as then the sum of two homomorphisms need not be a homomorphism. However, the closure of the set of endomorphisms under the above operations is a canonical example of a near-ring that is not a ring.

== Properties ==
- Endomorphism rings always have additive and multiplicative identities, respectively the zero map and identity map.
- Endomorphism rings are associative, but typically non-commutative.
- If a module is simple, then its endomorphism ring is a division ring (this is sometimes called Schur's lemma).
- A module is indecomposable if and only if its endomorphism ring does not contain any non-trivial idempotent elements. If the module is an injective module, then indecomposability is equivalent to the endomorphism ring being a local ring.
- For a semisimple module, the endomorphism ring is a von Neumann regular ring.
- The endomorphism ring of a nonzero right uniserial module has either one or two maximal right ideals. If the module is Artinian, Noetherian, projective or injective, then the endomorphism ring has a unique maximal ideal, so that it is a local ring.
- The endomorphism ring of an Artinian uniform module is a local ring.
- The endomorphism ring of a module with finite composition length is a semiprimary ring.
- The endomorphism ring of a continuous module or discrete module is a clean ring.
- If an R module is finitely generated and projective (that is, a progenerator), then the endomorphism ring of the module and R share all Morita invariant properties. A fundamental result of Morita theory is that all rings equivalent to R arise as endomorphism rings of progenerators.

== Examples ==
- In the category of R-modules, the endomorphism ring of an R-module M will only use the R-module homomorphisms, which are typically a proper subset of the abelian group homomorphisms. (Note: Abelian groups may also be viewed as modules over the ring of integers.) When M is a finitely generated projective module, the endomorphism ring is central to Morita equivalence of module categories.
- For any abelian group $A$, $\mathrm{M}_n(\operatorname{End}(A))\cong \operatorname{End}(A^n)$, since any matrix in $\mathrm{M}_n(\operatorname{End}(A))$ carries a natural homomorphism structure of $A^n$ as follows:
  $$\begin{pmatrix}\varphi_{11}&\cdots &\varphi_{1n}\\ \vdots& &\vdots \\ \varphi_{n1}&\cdots& \varphi_{nn}  \end{pmatrix}\begin{pmatrix}a_1\\\vdots\\a_n\end{pmatrix}=\begin{pmatrix}\sum_{i=1}^n\varphi_{1i}(a_i)\\\vdots\\\sum_{i=1}^n\varphi_{ni}(a_i) \end{pmatrix}.$$

One can use this isomorphism to construct many non-commutative endomorphism rings. For example: $\operatorname{End}(\mathbb{Z}\times \mathbb{Z})\cong \mathrm{M}_2(\mathbb{Z})$, since $\operatorname{End}(\mathbb{Z})\cong \mathbb{Z}$.
Also, when $R=K$ is a field, there is a canonical isomorphism $\operatorname{End}(K)\cong K$, so $\operatorname{End}(K^n)\cong \mathrm{M}_n(K)$, that is, the endomorphism ring of a $K$-vector space is identified with the ring of n-by-n matrices with entries in $K$. More generally, the endomorphism algebra of the free module $M = R^n$ is naturally $n$-by-$n$ matrices with entries in the ring $R$.

- As a particular example of the last point, for any ring R with unity, End(R_{R}) = R, where the elements of R act on R by left multiplication.
- In general, endomorphism rings can be defined for the objects of any preadditive category.
