= Alfred Goldie =

English mathematician

Alfred William Goldie (10 December 1920, Coseley, Staffordshire – 8 October 2005, Barrow-in-Furness, Cumbria) was an English mathematician.

== Biography ==
Goldie was educated at Wolverhampton Grammar School and then read mathematics at St John's College, Cambridge. His studies were interrupted by war work on ballistics with the Armament Research Department of the Ministry of Supply, eventually taking his BA in 1942 and MA in 1946.

== Academic career ==
Goldie became an assistant lecturer at the University of Nottingham in 1946. In 1948 he was appointed lecturer in Pure Mathematics at what was then King's College, Durham (and has been the University of Newcastle upon Tyne since 1963) where he was promoted to senior lecturer in 1958 and reader in algebra in 1960.

In 1963 Goldie was appointed Professor of Pure Mathematics at the University of Leeds. He retired from his chair in 1986 with the title emeritus professor.

Goldie won the 1970 Senior Berwick Prize from the London Mathematical Society, where he also served as vice-president from 1978 to 1980.

Goldie worked in ring theory, where he introduced the notion of the uniform dimension of a module, and the reduced rank of a module. He is well known for Goldie's theorem, which characterizes right Goldie rings. Indeed, his Independent obituary described him as the "Lord of the Rings".

== Personal life ==
Goldie married Mary Kenyon in 1944. They had three children (from eldest to youngest): Isobel (Carlyle), Helen, and John. Both Isobel and Helen completed PhDs in Geography, while John completed a degree in music. Mary died in 1995 and in 2002 he married Margaret Turner, who survived him.
