= Orthogonal symmetric Lie algebra =

In mathematics, an orthogonal symmetric Lie algebra is a pair $(\mathfrak{g}, s)$ consisting of a real Lie algebra $\mathfrak{g}$ and an automorphism $s$ of $\mathfrak{g}$ of order $2$ such that the eigenspace $\mathfrak{u}$ of s corresponding to 1 (i.e., the set $\mathfrak{u}$ of fixed points) is a compact subalgebra. If "compactness" is omitted, it is called a symmetric Lie algebra. An orthogonal symmetric Lie algebra is said to be effective if $\mathfrak{u}$ intersects the center of $\mathfrak{g}$ trivially. In practice, effectiveness is often assumed; we do this in this article as well.

The canonical example is the Lie algebra of a symmetric space, $s$ being the differential of a symmetry.

Let $(\mathfrak{g}, s)$ be effective orthogonal symmetric Lie algebra, and let $\mathfrak{p}$ denotes the -1 eigenspace of $s$. We say that $(\mathfrak{g}, s)$ is of compact type if $\mathfrak{g}$ is compact and semisimple. If instead it is noncompact, semisimple, and if $\mathfrak{g}=\mathfrak{u}+\mathfrak{p}$ is a Cartan decomposition, then $(\mathfrak{g}, s)$ is of noncompact type. If $\mathfrak{p}$ is an Abelian ideal of $\mathfrak{g}$, then $(\mathfrak{g}, s)$ is said to be of Euclidean type.

Every effective, orthogonal symmetric Lie algebra decomposes into a direct sum of ideals $\mathfrak{g}_0$, $\mathfrak{g}_-$ and $\mathfrak{g}_+$, each invariant under $s$ and orthogonal with respect to the Killing form of $\mathfrak{g}$, and such that if $s_0$, $s_-$ and $s_+$ denote the restriction of $s$ to $\mathfrak{g}_0$, $\mathfrak{g}_-$ and $\mathfrak{g}_+$, respectively, then $(\mathfrak{g}_0,s_0)$, $(\mathfrak{g}_-,s_-)$ and $(\mathfrak{g}_+,s_+)$ are effective orthogonal symmetric Lie algebras of Euclidean type, compact type and noncompact type.
