= Tadashi Nakayama (mathematician) =

Japanese mathematician

Tadashi Nakayama (中山 正, Nakayama Tadashi; July 26, 1912, Tokyo Prefecture – June 5, 1964, Nagoya) was a mathematician who made important contributions to representation theory.

== Career ==
He received his degrees from the University of Tokyo and the University of Osaka and held permanent positions at the University of Osaka and Nagoya University. He had visiting positions at Princeton University, University of Illinois, and the University of Hamburg. Nakayama's lemma, Nakayama algebras, Nakayama's conjecture, and the Murnaghan–Nakayama rule are named after him.

== Selected works ==
- Nakayama, Tadasi (1939), "On Frobeniusean algebras. I", Annals of Mathematics, Second Series, 40 (3): 611–633, Bibcode:1939AnMat..40..611N, doi:10.2307/1968946, JSTOR 1968946, MR 0000016
- Nakayama, Tadasi (1941), "On Frobeniusean algebras. II" (PDF), Annals of Mathematics, Second Series, 42 (1): 1–21, doi:10.2307/1968984, JSTOR 1968984, MR 0004237
- Tadasi Nakayama. A note on the elementary divisor theory in non-commutative domains. Bull. Amer. Math. Soc. 44 (1938) 719–723. MR 1563855 doi:10.1090/S0002-9904-1938-06850-4
- Tadasi Nakayama. A remark on representations of groups. Bull. Amer. Math. Soc. 44 (1938) 233–235. MR 1563716 doi:10.1090/S0002-9904-1938-06723-7
- Tadasi Nakayama. A remark on the sum and the intersection of two normal ideals in an algebra. Bull. Amer. Math. Soc. 46 (1940) 469–472. MR 0001967 doi:10.1090/S0002-9904-1940-07235-0
- Tadasi Nakayama and Junji Hashimoto. On a problem of G. Birkhoff. Proc. Amer. Math. Soc. 1 (1950) 141–142. MR 0035279 doi:10.1090/S0002-9939-1950-0035279-X
- Tadasi Nakayama. Remark on the duality for noncommutative compact groups. Proc. Amer. Math. Soc. 2 (1951) 849–854. MR 0045131 doi:10.1090/S0002-9939-1951-0045131-2
- Tadasi Nakayama. Orthogonality relation for Frobenius- and quasi-Frobenius-algebras . Proc. Amer. Math. Soc. 3 (1952) 183–195. MR 0049876 doi:10.2307/2032255
- Tadasi Nakayama. Galois theory of simple rings. Trans. Amer. Math. Soc. 73 (1952) 276–292. MR 0049875 doi:10.1090/S0002-9947-1952-0049875-3
- Masatosi Ikeda and Tadasi Nakayama. On some characteristic properties of quasi-Frobenius and regular rings. Proc. Amer. Math. Soc. 5 (1954) 15–19. MR 0060489 doi:10.1090/S0002-9939-1954-0060489-9
