= Essential extension =

Concept in mathematics

In mathematics, specifically module theory, given a ring $R$ and an $R$-module $M$ with a submodule $N$, the module $M$ is said to be an essential extension of $N$ (or $N$ is said to be an essential submodule or large submodule of $M$) if for every submodule H of $M$,

$H\cap N=\{0\}\,$ implies that $H=\{0\}\,$

As a special case, an essential left ideal of $R$ is a left ideal that is essential as a submodule of the left module $_RR$. The left ideal has non-zero intersection with any non-zero left ideal of $R$. Analogously, an essential right ideal is exactly an essential submodule of the right $R$ module $R_R$.

The usual notations for essential extensions include the following two expressions:

$N\subseteq_e M\,$ (Lam 1999), and $N\trianglelefteq M$ (Anderson & Fuller 1992)

The dual notion of an essential submodule is that of superfluous submodule (or small submodule). A submodule $N$ is superfluous if for any other submodule $H$,

$N+H=M\,$ implies that $H=M\,$.

The usual notations for superfluous submodules include:

$N\subseteq_s M\,$ (Lam 1999), and $N\ll M$ (Anderson & Fuller 1992)

== Properties ==
Here are some of the elementary properties of essential extensions, given in the notation introduced above. Let $M$ be a module, and $K$, $N$ and $H$ be submodules of $M$ with $K\subseteq N$

- Clearly $M$ is an essential submodule of $M$, and the zero submodule of a nonzero module is never essential.
- $K\subseteq_e M$ if and only if $K\subseteq_e N$ and $N\subseteq_e M$
- $K \cap H \subseteq_e M$ if and only if $K\subseteq_e M$ and $H\subseteq_e M$

Using Zorn's Lemma it is possible to prove another useful fact: For any submodule $N$ of $M$, there exists a submodule $C$ such that

$$N\oplus C \subseteq_e M$$.

Furthermore, a module with no proper essential extension (that is, if the module is essential in another module, then it is equal to that module) is an injective module. It is then possible to prove that every module M has a maximal essential extension E(M), called the injective hull of M. The injective hull is necessarily an injective module, and is unique up to isomorphism. The injective hull is also minimal in the sense that any other injective module containing M contains a copy of E(M).

Many properties dualize to superfluous submodules, but not everything. Again let $M$ be a module, and $K$, $N$ and $H$ be submodules of $M$ with $K\subseteq N$.

- The zero submodule is always superfluous, and a nonzero module $M$ is never superfluous in itself.
- $N\subseteq_s M$ if and only if $K\subseteq_s M$ and $N/K \subseteq_s M/K$
- $K+H\subseteq_s M$ if and only if $K\subseteq_s M$ and $H\subseteq_s M$.

Since every module can be mapped via a monomorphism whose image is essential in an injective module (its injective hull), one might ask if the dual statement is true, i.e. for every module M, is there a projective module P and an epimorphism from P onto M whose kernel is superfluous? (Such a P is called a projective cover). The answer is "No" in general, and the special class of rings whose right modules all have projective covers is the class of right perfect rings.

One form of Nakayama's lemma is that J(R)M is a superfluous submodule of M when M is a finitely-generated module over R.

== Generalization ==
This definition can be generalized to an arbitrary abelian category $\mathbf C$. An essential extension is a monomorphism $u\colon M\to E$ such that for every non-zero subobject $s\colon N\to E$, the fibre product $N\times_E M\neq 0$.

In a general category, a morphism f : X → Y is essential if any morphism g : Y → Z is a monomorphism if and only if g ° f is a monomorphism (Porst 1981, Introduction). Taking g to be the identity morphism of Y shows that an essential morphism f must be a monomorphism.

If X has an injective hull Y, then Y is the largest essential extension of X (Porst 1981, Introduction (v)). But the largest essential extension may not be an injective hull. Indeed, in the category of T_{1} spaces and continuous maps, every object has a unique largest essential extension, but no space with more than one element has an injective hull (Hoffmann 1981).

== See also ==
- Dense submodules are a special type of essential submodule
