= Cover (algebra) =

Concept in abstract algebra

In abstract algebra, a cover is one instance of some mathematical structure mapping onto another instance, such as a group (trivially) covering a subgroup. This should not be confused with the concept of a cover in topology.

When some object X is said to cover another object Y, the cover is given by some surjective and structure-preserving map f : X → Y. The precise meaning of "structure-preserving" depends on the kind of mathematical structure of which X and Y are instances. In order to be interesting, the cover is usually endowed with additional properties, which are highly dependent on the context.

== Examples ==
A classic result in semigroup theory due to D. B. McAlister states that every inverse semigroup has an E-unitary cover; besides being surjective, the homomorphism in this case is also idempotent separating, meaning that in its kernel an idempotent and non-idempotent never belong to the same equivalence class.; something slightly stronger has actually been shown for inverse semigroups: every inverse semigroup admits an F-inverse cover. McAlister's covering theorem generalizes to orthodox semigroups: every orthodox semigroup has a unitary cover.

Examples from other areas of algebra include the Frattini cover of a profinite group and the universal cover of a Lie group.

== Modules ==
If F is some family of modules over some ring R, then an F-cover of a module M is a homomorphism X→M with the following properties:

- X is in the family F
- X→M is surjective
- Any surjective map from a module in the family F to M factors through X
- Any endomorphism of X commuting with the map to M is an automorphism.

In general an F-cover of M need not exist, but if it does exist then it is unique up to (non-unique) isomorphism.

Examples include:

- Projective covers (always exist over perfect rings)
- flat covers (always exist)
- torsion-free covers (always exist over integral domains)
- injective covers

== See also ==
- Embedding
