= Eakin–Nagata theorem =

Theorem in abstract algebra

In abstract algebra, the Eakin–Nagata theorem states: given commutative rings $A \subset B$ such that $B$ is finitely generated as a module over $A$, if $B$ is a Noetherian ring, then $A$ is a Noetherian ring. (Note the converse is also true and is easier.)

The theorem is similar to the Artin–Tate lemma, which says that the same statement holds with "Noetherian" replaced by "finitely generated algebra" (assuming the base ring is a Noetherian ring).

The theorem was first proved in Paul M. Eakin's thesis (Eakin 1968) and later independently by Masayoshi Nagata (1968). The theorem can also be deduced from the characterization of a Noetherian ring in terms of injective modules, as done for example by David Eisenbud in (Eisenbud 1970); this approach is useful for a generalization to non-commutative rings.

== Proof ==
The following more general result is due to Edward W. Formanek and is proved by an argument rooted to the original proofs by Eakin and Nagata. According to (Matsumura 1989), this formulation is likely the most transparent one.

Theorem— Let $A$ be a commutative ring and $M$ a faithful finitely generated module over it. If the ascending chain condition holds on the submodules of the form $IM$ for ideals $I \subset A$, then $A$ is a Noetherian ring.

Proof: It is enough to show that $M$ is a Noetherian module since, in general, a ring admitting a faithful Noetherian module over it is a Noetherian ring. Suppose otherwise. By assumption, the set of all $IM$, where $I$ is an ideal of $A$ such that $M/IM$ is not Noetherian has a maximal element, $I_0 M$. Replacing $M$ and $A$ by $M/I_0 M$ and $A/\operatorname{Ann}(M/I_0 M)$, we can assume

- for each nonzero ideal $I \subset A$, the module $M/IM$ is Noetherian.

Next, consider the set $S$ of submodules $N \subset M$ such that $M/N$ is faithful. Choose a set of generators $\{ x_1, \dots, x_n \}$ of $M$ and then note that $M/N$ is faithful if and only if for each $a \in A$, the inclusion $\{ a x_1, \dots, a x_n \} \subset N$ implies $a = 0$. Thus, it is clear that Zorn's lemma applies to the set $S$, and so the set has a maximal element, $N_0$. Now, if $M/N_0$ is Noetherian, then it is a faithful Noetherian module over A and, consequently, A is a Noetherian ring, a contradiction. Hence, $M/N_0$ is not Noetherian and replacing $M$ by $M/N_0$, we can also assume

- each nonzero submodule $N \subset M$ is such that $M/N$ is not faithful.

Let a submodule $0 \ne N \subset M$ be given. Since $M/N$ is not faithful, there is a nonzero element $a \in A$ such that $aM \subset N$. By assumption, $M/aM$ is Noetherian and so $N/aM$ is finitely generated. Since $aM$ is also finitely generated, it follows that $N$ is finitely generated; i.e., $M$ is Noetherian, a contradiction. $\square$
