= Artin–Tate lemma =

In algebra, the Artin–Tate lemma, named after John Tate and his former advisor Emil Artin, states:

Let A be a commutative Noetherian ring and $B \sub C$ commutative algebras over A. If C is of finite type over A and if C is finite over B, then B is of finite type over A.

(Here, "of finite type" means "finitely generated algebra" and "finite" means "finitely generated module".) The lemma was introduced by E. Artin and J. Tate in 1951 to give a proof of Hilbert's Nullstellensatz.

The lemma is similar to the Eakin–Nagata theorem, which says: if C is finite over B and C is a Noetherian ring, then B is a Noetherian ring.

== Proof ==
The following proof can be found in Atiyah–MacDonald. Let $x_1,\ldots, x_m$ generate $C$ as an $A$-algebra and let $y_1, \ldots, y_n$ generate $C$ as a $B$-module. Then we can write

$$x_i = \sum_j b_{ij}y_j \quad \text{and} \quad y_iy_j = \sum_{k}b_{ijk}y_k$$

with $b_{ij},b_{ijk} \in B$. Then $C$ is finite over the $A$-algebra $B_0$ generated by the $b_{ij},b_{ijk}$. Using that $A$ and hence $B_0$ is Noetherian, also $B$ is finite over $B_0$. Since $B_0$ is a finitely generated $A$-algebra, also $B$ is a finitely generated $A$-algebra.

== Noetherian necessary ==
Without the assumption that A is Noetherian, the statement of the Artin–Tate lemma is no longer true. Indeed, for any non-Noetherian ring A we can define an A-algebra structure on $C = A\oplus A$ by declaring $(a,x)(b,y) = (ab,bx+ay)$. Then for any ideal $I \subset A$ which is not finitely generated, $B = A \oplus I \subset C$ is not of finite type over A, but all conditions as in the lemma are satisfied.
