= Perfect ring =

In the area of abstract algebra known as ring theory, a left perfect ring is a type of ring over which all left modules have projective covers. The right case is defined by analogy, and the condition is not left-right symmetric; that is, there exist rings which are perfect on one side but not the other. Perfect rings were introduced in Bass's book.

A semiperfect ring is a ring over which every finitely generated left module has a projective cover. This property is left-right symmetric.

== Perfect ring ==
=== Definitions ===
The following equivalent definitions of a left perfect ring R are found in Anderson and Fuller:

- Every left R-module has a projective cover.
- R/J(R) is semisimple and J(R) is left T-nilpotent (that is, for every infinite sequence of elements of J(R) there is an n such that the product of first n terms are zero), where J(R) is the Jacobson radical of R.
- (Bass' Theorem P) R satisfies the descending chain condition on principal right ideals. (There is no mistake; this condition on right principal ideals is equivalent to the ring being left perfect.)
- Every flat left R-module is projective.
- R/J(R) is semisimple and every non-zero left R-module contains a maximal submodule.
- R contains no infinite orthogonal set of idempotents, and every non-zero right R-module contains a minimal submodule.

=== Examples ===
- Right or left Artinian rings, and semiprimary rings are known to be right-and-left perfect.
- The following is an example (due to Bass) of a local ring which is right but not left perfect. Let F be a field, and consider a certain ring of infinite matrices over F.

Take the set of infinite matrices with entries indexed by $\mathbb{N} \times \mathbb{N}$, and which have only finitely many nonzero entries, all of them above the diagonal, and denote this set by $J$. Also take the matrix $I\,$ with all 1's on the diagonal, and form the set

$$R = \{f\cdot I+j\mid f\in F, j\in J \}\,$$

It can be shown that R is a ring with identity, whose Jacobson radical is J. Furthermore R/J is a field, so that R is local, and R is right but not left perfect.

=== Properties ===
For a left perfect ring R:

- From the equivalences above, every left R-module has a maximal submodule and a projective cover, and the flat left R-modules coincide with the projective left modules.
- An analogue of the Baer's criterion holds for projective modules.

== Semiperfect ring ==
=== Definition ===
Let R be a ring. Then R is semiperfect if any of the following equivalent conditions hold:

- R/J(R) is semisimple and idempotents lift modulo J(R), where J(R) is the Jacobson radical of R.
- R has a complete orthogonal set e_{1}, ..., e_{n} of idempotents with each e_{i}Re_{i} a local ring.
- Every simple left (right) R-module has a projective cover.
- Every finitely generated left (right) R-module has a projective cover.
- The category of finitely generated projective $R$-modules is Krull-Schmidt.

=== Examples ===
Examples of semiperfect rings include:

- Left (right) perfect rings.
- Local rings.
- Left (right) Artinian rings.
- Finite dimensional k-algebras.

=== Properties ===
Since a ring R is semiperfect iff every simple left R-module has a projective cover, every ring Morita equivalent to a semiperfect ring is also semiperfect.

=== Basic ring ===
For a fixed semiperfect ring R, there is (up to a ring isomorphism) a canonical representative of the class of rings Morita equivalent to R called a basic ring for R. A semiperfect ring is basic if and only if R/J(R) is a direct product of division rings.

Given a complete orthogonal set e_{1}, ..., e_{n} of local idempotents, we can assume ordering of this set in such a way that the for some i≤n the right modules e_{1}R, ..., e_{i}R form a complete set of finitely generated projective right modules. The idempotent e=e_{1}+ ... + e_{i} is then called a basic idempotent and the corner ring B:=eRe isomorphic to End_{R}(e_{1}R + ...+ e_{i} R) is the basic ring for R.

The map I→IR defines embedding of the lattice of right ideals of B into that of R. The map I→RIR defines an isomorphism of the lattice of ideals of B and the lattice of ideals of R. This isomorphism respects multiplication of ideals.
