= Idempotent (ring theory) =

In mathematics, element that equals its square

In ring theory, a branch of mathematics, an idempotent element or simply idempotent of a ring is an element a such that a^{2} = a. (Note: Idempotent and nilpotent were introduced by Benjamin Peirce in 1870.) That is, the element is idempotent under the ring's multiplication. Inductively then, one can also conclude that a = a^{2} = a^{3} = a^{4} = ... = a^{n} for any positive integer n. For example, an idempotent element of a matrix ring is precisely an idempotent matrix.

For general rings, elements idempotent under multiplication are involved in decompositions of modules, and connected to homological properties of the ring. In Boolean algebra, the main objects of study are rings in which all elements are idempotent under both addition and multiplication.

== Examples ==
=== Quotients of Z ===
One may consider the ring of integers modulo n, where n is square-free. By the Chinese remainder theorem, this ring factors into the product of rings of integers modulo p, where p is prime. Now each of these factors is a field, so it is clear that the factors' only idempotents will be 0 and 1. That is, each factor has two idempotents. So if there are m factors, there will be 2^{m} idempotents.

We can check this for the integers mod 6, R = Z / 6Z. Since 6 has two prime factors (2 and 3) it should have 2^{2} idempotents.

0^{2} ≡ 0 ≡ 0 (mod 6)
1^{2} ≡ 1 ≡ 1 (mod 6)
2^{2} ≡ 4 ≡ 4 (mod 6)
3^{2} ≡ 9 ≡ 3 (mod 6)
4^{2} ≡ 16 ≡ 4 (mod 6)
5^{2} ≡ 25 ≡ 1 (mod 6)

From these computations, 0, 1, 3, and 4 are idempotents of this ring, while 2 and 5 are not. This also demonstrates the decomposition properties described below: because 3 + 4 ≡ 1 (mod 6), there is a ring decomposition 3Z / 6Z ⊕ 4Z / 6Z. In 3Z / 6Z the multiplicative identity is 3 + 6Z and in 4Z / 6Z the multiplicative identity is 4 + 6Z.

=== Quotient of polynomial ring ===
Given a ring R and an element f ∈ R such that f^{2} ≠ 0, the quotient ring

R / (f^{2} − f)

has the idempotent f. For example, this could be applied to x ∈ Z[x], or any polynomial f ∈ k[x_{1}, ..., x_{n}].

=== Idempotents in the ring of split-quaternions ===
There is a circle of idempotents in the ring of split-quaternions. Split quaternions have the structure of a real algebra, so elements can be written w + xi + yj + zk over a basis {1, i, j, k}, with j^{2} = k^{2} = +1. For any θ,

$s = j \cos \theta + k \sin \theta$ satisfies s^{2} = +1 since j and k satisfy the anticommutative property. Now
$\left(\frac{1+s}{2}\right)^2 = \frac{1 + 2s + s^2}{4} = \frac{1+s}{2},$ the idempotent property.

The element s is called a hyperbolic unit and so far, the i-coordinate has been taken as zero. When this coordinate is non-zero, then there is a hyperboloid of one sheet of hyperbolic units in split-quaternions. The same equality shows the idempotent property of $\frac{1 + s}{2}$ where s is on the hyperboloid.

== Types of ring idempotents ==
A partial list of important types of idempotents includes:

- Two idempotents a and b are called orthogonal if ab = ba = 0. If a is idempotent in the ring R (with unity), then so is b = 1 − a; moreover, a and b are orthogonal.
- An idempotent a in R is called a central idempotent if ax = xa for all x in R, that is, if a is in the center of R.
- A trivial idempotent refers to either of the elements 0 and 1, which are always idempotent.
- A primitive idempotent of a ring R is a nonzero idempotent a such that aR is indecomposable as a right R-module; that is, such that aR is not a direct sum of two nonzero submodules. Equivalently, a is a primitive idempotent if it cannot be written as a = e + f, where e and f are nonzero orthogonal idempotents in R.
- A local idempotent is an idempotent a such that aRa is a local ring. This implies that aR is directly indecomposable, so local idempotents are also primitive.
- A right irreducible idempotent is an idempotent a for which aR is a simple module. By Schur's lemma, End_{R}(aR) = aRa is a division ring, and hence is a local ring, so right (and left) irreducible idempotents are local.
- A centrally primitive idempotent is a central idempotent a that cannot be written as the sum of two nonzero orthogonal central idempotents.
- An idempotent a + I in the quotient ring R / I is said to lift modulo I if there is an idempotent b in R such that b + I = a + I.
- An idempotent a of R is called a full idempotent if RaR = R.
- A separability idempotent; see Separable algebra.

Any non-trivial idempotent a is a zero divisor (because ab = 0 with neither a nor b being zero, where b = 1 − a). This shows that integral domains and division rings do not have such idempotents. Local rings also do not have such idempotents, but for a different reason. The only idempotent contained in the Jacobson radical of a ring is 0.

== Rings characterized by idempotents ==
- A ring in which all elements are idempotent is called a Boolean ring. Some authors use the term "idempotent ring" for this type of ring. In such a ring, multiplication is commutative and every element is its own additive inverse.
- A ring is semisimple if and only if every right (or every left) ideal is generated by an idempotent.
- A ring is von Neumann regular if and only if every finitely generated right (or every finitely generated left) ideal is generated by an idempotent.
- A ring for which the annihilator r.Ann(S) every subset S of R is generated by an idempotent is called a Baer ring. If the condition only holds for all singleton subsets of R, then the ring is a right Rickart ring. Both of these types of rings are interesting even when they lack a multiplicative identity.
- A ring in which all idempotents are central is called an abelian ring. Such rings need not be commutative.
- A ring is directly irreducible if and only if 0 and 1 are the only central idempotents.
- A ring R can be written as e_{1}R ⊕ e_{2}R ⊕ ... ⊕ e_{n}R with each e_{i} a local idempotent if and only if R is a semiperfect ring.
- A ring is called an SBI ring or Lift/rad ring if all idempotents of R lift modulo the Jacobson radical.
- A ring satisfies the ascending chain condition on right direct summands if and only if the ring satisfies the descending chain condition on left direct summands if and only if every set of pairwise orthogonal idempotents is finite.
- If a is idempotent in the ring R, then aRa is again a ring, with multiplicative identity a. The ring aRa is often referred to as a corner ring of R. The corner ring arises naturally since the ring of endomorphisms End_{R}(aR) ≅ aRa.

== Role in decompositions ==
The idempotents of R have an important connection to decomposition of R-modules. If M is an R-module and E = End_{R}(M) is its ring of endomorphisms, then A ⊕ B = M if and only if there is a unique idempotent e in E such that A = eM and B = (1 − e)M. Clearly then, M is directly indecomposable if and only if 0 and 1 are the only idempotents in E.

In the case when M = R (assumed unital), the endomorphism ring End_{R}(R) = R, where each endomorphism arises as left multiplication by a fixed ring element. With this modification of notation, A ⊕ B = R as right modules if and only if there exists a unique idempotent e such that eR = A and (1 − e)R = B. Thus every direct summand of R is generated by an idempotent.

If a is a central idempotent, then the corner ring aRa = Ra is a ring with multiplicative identity a. Just as idempotents determine the direct decompositions of R as a module, the central idempotents of R determine the decompositions of R as a direct sum of rings. If R is the direct sum of the rings R_{1}, ..., R_{n}, then the identity elements of the rings R_{i} are central idempotents in R, pairwise orthogonal, and their sum is 1. Conversely, given central idempotents a_{1}, ..., a_{n} in R that are pairwise orthogonal and have sum 1, then R is the direct sum of the rings Ra_{1}, ..., Ra_{n}. So in particular, every central idempotent a in R gives rise to a decomposition of R as a direct sum of the corner rings aRa and (1 − a)R(1 − a). As a result, a ring R is directly indecomposable as a ring if and only if the identity 1 is centrally primitive.

Working inductively, one can attempt to decompose 1 into a sum of centrally primitive elements. If 1 is centrally primitive, we are done. If not, it is a sum of central orthogonal idempotents, which in turn are primitive or sums of more central idempotents, and so on. The problem that may occur is that this may continue without end, producing an infinite family of central orthogonal idempotents. The condition "R does not contain infinite sets of central orthogonal idempotents" is a type of finiteness condition on the ring. It can be achieved in many ways, such as requiring the ring to be right Noetherian. If a decomposition R = c_{1}R ⊕ c_{2}R ⊕ ... ⊕ c_{n}R exists with each c_{i} a centrally primitive idempotent, then R is a direct sum of the corner rings c_{i}Rc_{i}, each of which is ring irreducible.

For associative algebras or Jordan algebras over a field, the Peirce decomposition is a decomposition of an algebra as a sum of eigenspaces of commuting idempotent elements.

== Relation with involutions ==
If a is an idempotent of a ring R, then the square of f = 1 − 2a equals 1. So, for every left R-module, the multiplication by f is an involution of M; that is, it is an R-module homomorphism such that f^{2} is the identity endomorphism of M.

If $M$ is an $R$-bimodule, and, in particular, if $M=R$, the left and the right multiplications with $f$ gives rise to two involutions of the module.

Conversely, if b is an element of $R$ such that $b^2=1$, then $(1- b)^2= 2(1- b)$, and, if 2 is an invertible element in R, a=2^{−1}(1 − b) is an idempotent such that b = 1 − 2a. Thus, for a ring in which 2 is invertible, the idempotent elements are in one-to-one correspondence with the elements whose square is 1.

== Category of R-modules ==
Lifting idempotents also has major consequences for the category of R-modules. All idempotents lift modulo I if and only if every R direct summand of R/I has a projective cover as an R-module. Idempotents always lift modulo nil ideals and rings for which R is I-adically complete.

Lifting is most important when I = J(R), the Jacobson radical of R. Yet another characterization of semiperfect rings is that they are semilocal rings whose idempotents lift modulo J(R).

== Lattice of idempotents ==
One may define a partial order on the idempotents of a ring as follows: if a and b are idempotents, we write a ≤ b if and only if ab = ba = a. With respect to this order, 0 is the smallest and 1 the largest idempotent. For orthogonal idempotents a and b, a + b is also idempotent, and we have a ≤ a + b and b ≤ a + b. The atoms of this partial order are precisely the primitive idempotents.

When the above partial order is restricted to the central idempotents of R, a lattice structure, or even a Boolean algebra structure, can be given. For two central idempotents e and f, the complement is given by

¬e = 1 − e,

the meet is given by

e ∧ f = ef.

and the join is given by

e ∨ f = ¬(¬e ∧ ¬f) = e + f − ef

The ordering now becomes simply e ≤ f if and only if eR ⊆ fR, and the join and meet satisfy (e ∨ f)R = eR + fR and (e ∧ f)R = eR ∩ fR = (eR)(fR). It is shown in Goodearl 1991, p. 99 that if R is von Neumann regular and right self-injective, then the lattice is a complete lattice.
