= Schanuel =

Schanuel is a surname. Notable people with the surname include:

- Nolan Schanuel (born 2002), American baseball player
- Stephen Schanuel (1933–2014), American mathematician
  - Schanuel's conjecture
  - Schanuel's lemma
