= Noether normalization lemma =

Result of commutative algebra

In mathematics, the Noether normalization lemma (sometimes referred to as a theorem rather than a lemma) is a result of commutative algebra, introduced by Emmy Noether in 1926. It states that for any field $k$, and any finitely generated commutative k-algebra $A$, there exist elements $y_1,y_2,\ldots,y_d$ in $A$ that are algebraically independent over $k$ and such that $A$ is a finitely generated module over the polynomial ring $S=k[y_1,y_2,\ldots,y_d]$. The integer $d$ is equal to the Krull dimension of the ring $A$; and if $A$ is an integral domain, $d$ is also the transcendence degree of the field of fractions of $A$ over k.

The theorem has a geometric interpretation. Suppose A is the coordinate ring of an affine variety X, and consider S as the coordinate ring of a d-dimensional affine space $\mathbb A^d_k$. Then the inclusion map $S\hookrightarrow A$ induces a surjective finite morphism of affine varieties $X\to \mathbb A^d_k$: that is, any affine variety is a branched covering of affine space. When k is infinite, such a branched covering map can be constructed by taking a general projection from an affine space containing X to a d-dimensional subspace.

More generally, in the language of schemes, the theorem can equivalently be stated as: every affine k-scheme (of finite type) X is finite over an affine n-dimensional space. The theorem can be refined to include a chain of ideals of R (equivalently, closed subsets of X) that are finite over the affine coordinate subspaces of the corresponding dimensions.

The Noether normalization lemma yields Zariski's lemma as a corollary. In turn, Zariski's lemma can be used to give a straightforward proof of Hilbert's Nullstellensatz, one of the most fundamental results of classical algebraic geometry. Noether normalization is also an important tool in establishing the notion of Krull dimension for k-algebras.

== Statement and proof ==
Theorem. (Noether Normalization Lemma) Let k be a field and $A=k[y_1',...,y_m']$ be a finitely generated k-algebra. Then for some integer d, $0\leq d\leq m$, there exist $y_1,\ldots,y_d\in A$ algebraically independent over k such that A is finite (i.e., finitely generated as a module) over $k[y_1,\ldots,y_d]$ (the integer d is then equal to the Krull dimension of A). If A is an integral domain, then d is also the transcendence degree of the field of fractions of A over k.

The following proof is due to Nagata and appears in Mumford's Red Book. A second, more geometric proof is given on page 176 of the same text.

Proof: We shall induct on m. Case $m = 0$ is $k=A$ and there is nothing to prove. Assume $m=1$. Then $A\cong k[y]/I$ as k-algebras, where $I\subset k[y]$ is some ideal. Since $k[y]$ is a PID (it is a Euclidean domain), $I=(f)$. If $f=0$ we are done, so assume $f\neq 0$. Let e be the degree of f. Then A is generated, as a k-vector space, by $1,y,y^2,\dots,y^{e-1}$. Thus A is finite over k. Assume now $m \geq 2$. If the $y_i'$ are algebraically independent, then by setting $y_i=y_i'$, we are done. If not, it is enough to prove the claim that there is a k-subalgebra S of A that is generated by $m-1$ elements, such that A is finite over S. Indeed, by the inductive hypothesis, we can find, for some integer d, $0\leq d\leq m-1$, algebraically independent elements $y_1, ..., y_{d}$ of S such that S is finite over $k[y_1, ..., y_d]$. Since A is finite over S, and S is finite over $k[y_1, ..., y_d]$, we obtain the desired conclusion that A is finite over $k[y_1, ..., y_d]$.

To prove the claim, we assume by hypothesis that the $y_i'$ are not algebraically independent, so that there is a nonzero polynomial f in m variables over k such that

$$f(y_1', \ldots, y_m') = 0$$.

Given an integer r which is determined later, set

$$z_i = y_i' - (y_1')^{r^{i-1}}, \quad 2 \le i \le m,$$

and, for simplification of notation, write $\tilde{y}=y_1'.$

Then the preceding reads:

$$f(\tilde{y}, z_2 + \tilde{y}^r, z_3 + \tilde{y}^{r^2}, \ldots, z_m + {\tilde{y}}^{r^{m-1}}) = 0.\ \ \ (*)$$

Now, if $a \tilde{y}^{\alpha_1} \prod_2^m (z_i + {\tilde{y}}^{r^{i-1}})^{\alpha_i}$ is a monomial appearing in the left-hand side of the above equation, with coefficient $a \in k$, the highest term in $\tilde{y}$ after expanding the product looks like

$$a {\tilde{y}}^{\alpha_1 + \alpha_2 r + \cdots + \alpha_m r^{m-1}}$$.

Whenever the above exponent agrees with the highest $\tilde{y}$ exponent produced by some other monomial, it is possible that the highest term in $\tilde{y}$ of $f(\tilde{y}, z_2 + \tilde{y}^r, z_3 + \tilde{y}^{r^2}, ..., z_m + {\tilde{y}}^{r^{m-1}})$ will not be of the above form, because it may be affected by cancellation. However, if r is large enough (e.g., we can set $r = 1 + \deg f$), then each $\alpha_1 + \alpha_2 r + \cdots + \alpha_m r^{m-1}$ encodes a unique base r number, so this does not occur. For such an r, let $c\in k$ be the coefficient of the unique monomial of f of multidegree $(\alpha_1,\dots,\alpha_m)$ for which the quantity $\alpha_1 + \alpha_2 r + \cdots + \alpha_m r^{m-1}$ is maximal. Multiplication of $(*)$ by $1/c$ gives an integral dependence equation of $\tilde{y}$ over $S = k[z_2, ..., z_m]$, i.e., $y_1'(=\tilde{y})$ is integral over S. Moreover, because $A=S[y_1']$, A is in fact finite over S. This completes the proof of the claim, so we are done with the first part.

Moreover, if A is an integral domain, then d is the transcendence degree of its field of fractions. Indeed, A and the polynomial ring $S = k[y_1, ..., y_d]$ have the same transcendence degree (i.e., the degree of the field of fractions) since the field of fractions of A is algebraic over that of S (as A is integral over S) and S has transcendence degree d. Thus, it remains to show the Krull dimension of S is d. (This is also a consequence of dimension theory.) We induct on d, with the case $d=0$ being trivial. Since $0 \subsetneq (y_1) \subsetneq (y_1, y_2) \subsetneq \cdots \subsetneq (y_1, \dots, y_d)$ is a chain of prime ideals, the dimension is at least d. To get the reverse estimate, let $0 \subsetneq \mathfrak{p}_1 \subsetneq \cdots \subsetneq \mathfrak{p}_m$ be a chain of prime ideals. Let $0 \ne u \in \mathfrak{p}_1$. We apply the Noether normalization and get $T = k[u, z_2, \dots, z_d]$ (in the normalization process, we're free to choose the first variable) such that S is integral over T. By the inductive hypothesis, $T/(u)$ has dimension $d-1$. By incomparability, $\mathfrak{p}_i \cap T$ is a chain of length $m$ and then, in $T/(\mathfrak{p}_1 \cap T)$, it becomes a chain of length $m-1$. Since $\operatorname{dim} T/(\mathfrak{p}_1 \cap T) \le \operatorname{dim} T/(u)$, we have $m - 1 \le d - 1$. Hence, $\dim S \le d$. $\square$

== Refinement ==
The following refinement appears in Eisenbud's book, which builds on Nagata's idea:

Theorem—Let A be a finitely generated algebra over a field k, and $I_1 \subset \dots \subset I_m$ be a chain of ideals such that $\operatorname{dim} (A/I_i) = d_i > d_{i+1}.$ Then there exists algebraically independent elements y_{1}, ..., y_{d} in A such that

1. A is a finitely generated module over the polynomial subring S = k[y_{1}, ..., y_{d}].
2. $I_i \cap S = (y_{d_i+1}, \dots, y_d)$.
3. If the $I_i$'s are homogeneous, then y_{i}'s may be taken to be homogeneous.

Moreover, if k is an infinite field, then any sufficiently general choice of y_{I}'s has Property 1 above ("sufficiently general" is made precise in the proof).

Geometrically speaking, the last part of the theorem says that for $X = \operatorname{Spec} A \subset \mathbf{A}^m$ any general linear projection $\mathbf{A}^m \to \mathbf{A}^d$ induces a finite morphism $X \to \mathbf{A}^d$ (cf. the lede); besides Eisenbud, see also .

Corollary—Let A be an integral domain that is a finitely generated algebra over a field. If $\mathfrak{p}$ is a prime ideal of A, then

$$\dim A = \operatorname{height} \mathfrak{p} + \dim A/\mathfrak{p}$$.

In particular, the Krull dimension of the localization of A at any maximal ideal is dim A.

Corollary—Let $A \subset B$ be integral domains that are finitely generated algebras over a field. Then

$$\dim B = \dim A + \operatorname{tr.deg}_{Q(A)} Q(B)$$

(the special case of Nagata's altitude formula).

== Illustrative application: generic freeness ==
A typical nontrivial application of the normalization lemma is the generic freeness theorem: Let $A, B$ be rings such that $A$ is a Noetherian integral domain and suppose there is a ring homomorphism $A \to B$ that exhibits $B$ as a finitely generated algebra over $A$. Then there is some $0 \ne g \in A$ such that $B[g^{-1}]$ is a free $A[g^{-1}]$-module.

To prove this, let $F$ be the fraction field of $A$. We argue by induction on the Krull dimension of $F \otimes_A B$. The base case is when the Krull dimension is $-\infty$; i.e., $F \otimes_A B = 0$; that is, when there is some $0 \ne g \in A$ such that $g B = 0$ , so that $B[g^{-1}]$ is free as an $A[g^{-1}]$-module. For the inductive step, note that $F \otimes_A B$ is a finitely generated $F$-algebra. Hence by the Noether normalization lemma, $F \otimes_A B$ contains algebraically independent elements $x_1, \dots, x_d$ such that $F \otimes_A B$ is finite over the polynomial ring $F[x_1, \dots, x_d]$. Multiplying each $x_i$ by elements of $A$, we can assume $x_i$ are in $B$. We now consider:

$$A' := A[x_1, \dots, x_d] \to B.$$

Now $B$ may not be finite over $A'$, but it will become finite after inverting a single element as follows. If $b$ is an element of $B$, then, as an element of $F \otimes_A B$, it is integral over $F[x_1, \dots, x_d]$; i.e., $b^n + a_1 b^{n-1} + \dots + a_n = 0$ for some $a_i$ in $F[x_1, \dots, x_d]$. Thus, some $0 \ne g \in A$ kills all the denominators of the coefficients of $a_i$ and so $b$ is integral over $A'[g^{-1}]$. Choosing some finitely many generators of $B$ as an $A'$-algebra and applying this observation to each generator, we find some $0 \ne g \in A$ such that $B[g^{-1}]$ is integral (thus finite) over $A'[g^{-1}]$. Replace $B, A$ by $B[g^{-1}], A[g^{-1}]$ and then we can assume $B$ is finite over $A' := A[x_1, \dots, x_d]$. To finish, consider a finite filtration $B = B_0 \supset B_1 \supset B_2 \supset \cdots \supset B_r$ by $A'$-submodules such that $B_i / B_{i+1} \simeq A'/\mathfrak{p}_i$ for prime ideals $\mathfrak{p}_i$ (such a filtration exists by the theory of associated primes). For each i, if $\mathfrak{p}_i \ne 0$, by inductive hypothesis, we can choose some $g_i \ne 0$ in $A$ such that $A'/\mathfrak{p}_i[g_i^{-1}]$ is free as an $A[g_i^{-1}]$-module, while $A'$ is a polynomial ring and thus free. Hence, with $g = g_0 \cdots g_r$, $B[g^{-1}]$ is a free module over $A[g^{-1}]$. $\square$
