= Pure submodule =

Module components with flexibility in module theory

In mathematics, especially in the field of module theory, the concept of pure submodule provides a generalization of direct summand, a type of particularly well-behaved piece of a module. Pure modules are complementary to flat modules and generalize Prüfer's notion of pure subgroups. While flat modules are those modules which leave short exact sequences exact after tensoring, a pure submodule defines a short exact sequence (known as a pure exact sequence) that remains exact after tensoring with any module. Similarly a flat module is a direct limit of projective modules, and a pure exact sequence is a direct limit of split exact sequences.

== Definition ==
Let $R$ be a ring (associative, with $1$), let $M$ be a (left) module over $R$, and let $P$ be a submodule of $M$ with $\iota\colon P\hookrightarrow M$ be the natural injective map. Then $P$ is a pure submodule of $M$ if, for any (right) $R$-module $X$, the natural induced map $\mathrm{id}_X\otimes_R \iota\colon X\otimes_R P\to X\otimes_R M$ is injective.

Analogously, a short exact sequence

$$0 \longrightarrow A\,\ \stackrel{f}{\longrightarrow}\ B\,\ \stackrel{g}{\longrightarrow}\ C \longrightarrow 0$$

of (left) $R$-modules is pure exact if the sequence stays exact when tensored with any (right) $R$-module $X$. This is equivalent to saying that $f(A)$ is a pure submodule of $B$.

== Equivalent characterizations ==
Purity of a submodule can also be expressed element-wise; it is really a statement about the solvability of certain systems of linear equations. Specifically, $P$ is pure in $M$ if and only if the following condition holds: for any $m$-by-$n$ matrix $(a_{ij})$ with entries in $R$, and any set $y_1,\cdots,y_m$ of elements of $P$, if there exist elements $x_1,\cdots,x_n$ in $M$ such that

$$\sum_{j=1}^n a_{ij}x_j = y_i \qquad\mbox{ for } i=1,\ldots,m$$

then there also exist elements $x'_1,\cdots,x'_n$ in $P$ such that

$$\sum_{j=1}^n a_{ij}x'_j = y_i \qquad\mbox{ for } i=1,\ldots,m$$

Another characterization is: a sequence is pure exact if and only if it is the filtered colimit (also known as direct limit) of split exact sequences

$0 \longrightarrow A_i \longrightarrow B_i \longrightarrow C_i \longrightarrow 0.$

== Examples ==
- Every direct summand of M is pure in M. Consequently, every subspace of a vector space over a field is pure.

== Properties ==
Suppose $0 \longrightarrow A\,\ \stackrel{f}{\longrightarrow}\ B\,\ \stackrel{g}{\longrightarrow}\ C \longrightarrow 0$ is a short exact sequence of $R$-modules, then:

1. $C$ is a flat module if and only if the exact sequence is pure exact for every $A$ and $B$. From this we can deduce that over a von Neumann regular ring, every submodule of every $R$-module is pure. This is because every module over a von Neumann regular ring is flat. The converse is also true.
2. Suppose $B$ is flat. Then the sequence is pure exact if and only if $C$ is flat. From this one can deduce that pure submodules of flat modules are flat.
3. Suppose $C$ is flat. Then $B$ is flat if and only if $A$ is flat.

If $0 \longrightarrow A\,\ \stackrel{f}{\longrightarrow}\ B\,\ \stackrel{g}{\longrightarrow}\ C \longrightarrow 0$ is pure-exact, and $F$ is a finitely presented $R$-module, then every homomorphism from $F$ to $C$ can be lifted to $B$, i.e. to every $u\colon F\to C$ there exists $v\colon F\to B$ such that $gv=u$.
