= Finitely generated algebra =

Type of algebra

In mathematics, a finitely generated algebra (also called an algebra of finite type) over a (commutative) ring $R$, or a finitely generated $R$-algebra for short, is a commutative associative algebra $A$ defined by ring homomorphism $f:R\to A$, such that every element of $A$ can be expressed as a polynomial in a finite number of generators $a_1,\dots,a_n\in A$ with coefficients in $f(R)$. Put another way, there is a surjective $R$-algebra homomorphism from the polynomial ring $R[X_1,\dots,X_n]$ to $A$.

If $K$ is a field, regarded as a subalgebra of $A$, and $f$ is the natural injection $K\hookrightarrow A$, then a $K$-algebra of finite type is a commutative associative algebra $A$ where there exists a finite set of elements $a_1,\dots,a_n\in A$ such that every element of $A$ can be expressed as a polynomial in $a_1,\dots,a_n$, with coefficients in $K$.

Equivalently, there exist elements $a_1,\dots,a_n\in A$ such that the evaluation homomorphism at ${\bf a}=(a_1,\dots,a_n)$

$$\phi_{\bf a}\colon K[X_1,\dots,X_n]\twoheadrightarrow A$$

is surjective; thus, by applying the first isomorphism theorem, $A \cong K[X_1,\dots,X_n]/{\rm ker}(\phi_{\bf a})$.

Conversely, $A:= K[X_1,\dots,X_n]/I$ for any ideal $I\subseteq K[X_1,\dots,X_n]$ is a $K$-algebra of finite type, indeed any element of $A$ is a polynomial in the cosets $a_i:=X_i+I, i=1,\dots,n$ with coefficients in $K$. Therefore, we obtain the following characterisation of finitely generated $K$-algebras:

$A$ is a finitely generated $K$-algebra if and only if it is isomorphic as a $K$-algebra to a quotient ring of the type $K[X_1,\dots,X_n]/I$ by an ideal $I\subseteq K[X_1,\dots,X_n].$

Algebras that are not finitely generated are called infinitely generated.

A finitely generated ring refers to a ring that is finitely generated when it is regarded as a $\mathbb{Z}$-algebra.

An algebra being finitely generated (of finite type) should not be confused with an algebra being finite (see below). A finite algebra over $R$ is a commutative associative algebra $A$ that is finitely generated as a module; that is, an $R$-algebra defined by ring homomorphism $f:R\to A$, such that every element of $A$ can be expressed as a linear combination of a finite number of generators $a_1,\dots,a_n \in A$ with coefficients in $f(R)$. This is a stronger condition than $A$ being expressible as a polynomial in a finite set of generators in the case of the algebra being finitely generated.

== Examples ==
- The polynomial algebra $K[X_1,\dots,X_n]$ is finitely generated. The polynomial algebra in countably infinitely many generators is infinitely generated.
- The ring of real-coefficient polynomials $\Bbb{R}[X]$ is finitely generated over $\Bbb{R}$ but not over $\Bbb{Q}$.
- The field $E=K(T)$ of rational functions in one variable over an infinite field $K$ is not a finitely generated algebra over $K$. On the other hand, $E$ is generated over $K$ by a single element, $T$, as a field.
- If $E/F$ is a finite field extension then it follows from the definitions that $E$ is a finitely generated algebra over $F$.
- Conversely, if $E/F$ is a field extension and $E$ is a finitely generated algebra over $F$ then the field extension is finite. This is called Zariski's lemma. See also integral extension.
- If $G$ is a finitely generated group then the group algebra $KG$ is a finitely generated algebra over $K$.
- "Quadratic and quaternion algebras are essentially all the associative R-algebras which are finitely generated projective R-modules and have a standard involution."

== Properties ==
- A homomorphic image of a finitely generated algebra is itself finitely generated. However, a similar property for subalgebras does not hold in general.
- Hilbert's basis theorem: if $A$ is a finitely generated commutative algebra over a Noetherian ring then every ideal of A is finitely generated, or equivalently, $A$ is a Noetherian ring.

== Relation with affine varieties ==
Finitely generated reduced commutative algebras are basic objects of consideration in modern algebraic geometry, where they correspond to affine algebraic varieties; for this reason, these algebras are also referred to as (commutative) affine algebras. More precisely, given an affine algebraic set $V\subseteq \mathbb{A}^n$ we can associate a finitely generated $K$-algebra

$$\Gamma(V):=K[X_1,\dots,X_n]/I(V)$$

called the affine coordinate ring of $V$; moreover, if $\phi\colon V\to W$ is a regular map between the affine algebraic sets $V\subseteq \mathbb{A}^n$ and $W\subseteq \mathbb{A}^m$, we can define a homomorphism of $K$-algebras

$$\Gamma(\phi)\equiv\phi^*\colon\Gamma(W)\to\Gamma(V),\,\phi^*(f)=f\circ\phi,$$

then, $\Gamma$ is a contravariant functor from the category of affine algebraic sets with regular maps to the category of reduced finitely generated $K$-algebras: this functor turns out to be an equivalence of categories

$$\Gamma\colon
(\text{affine algebraic sets})^{\rm opp}\to(\text{reduced finitely generated }K\text{-algebras}),$$

and, restricting to affine varieties (i.e. irreducible affine algebraic sets),

$$\Gamma\colon
(\text{affine algebraic varieties})^{\rm opp}\to(\text{integral finitely generated }K\text{-algebras}).$$

== Finite algebras vs algebras of finite type ==
We recall that a commutative $R$-algebra $A$ is a ring homomorphism $\phi\colon R\to A$; the $R$-module structure of $A$ is defined by

$$\lambda \cdot a := \phi(\lambda)a,\quad\lambda\in R, a\in A.$$

An $R$-algebra $A$ is called finite if it is finitely generated as an $R$-module, i.e. there is a surjective homomorphism of $R$-modules

$$R^{\oplus_n}\twoheadrightarrow A.$$

Again, there is a characterisation of finite algebras in terms of quotients:

An $R$-algebra $A$ is finite if and only if it is isomorphic to a quotient $R^{\oplus_n}/M$ by an $R$-submodule $M\subseteq R$.

By definition, a finite $R$-algebra is of finite type, but the converse is false: the polynomial ring $R[X]$ is of finite type but not finite. However, if an $R$-algebra is of finite type and integral, then it is finite. More precisely, $A$ is a finitely generated $R$-module if and only if $A$ is generated as an $R$-algebra by a finite number of elements integral over $R$.

Finite algebras and algebras of finite type are related to the notions of finite morphisms and morphisms of finite type.

== See also ==
- Finitely generated module
- Finitely generated field extension
- Artin–Tate lemma
- Noether normalization lemma
- Finite algebra
- Morphism of finite type
