= Semi-local ring =

Algebraic ring classification

In mathematics, a semi-local ring is a ring for which R/J(R) is a semisimple ring, where J(R) is the Jacobson radical of R. (Lam 2001, p. §20)(Mikhalev & Pilz 2002, p. C.7)

The above definition is satisfied if R has a finite number of maximal right ideals (and finite number of maximal left ideals). When R is a commutative ring, the converse implication is also true, and so the definition of semi-local for commutative rings is often taken to be "having finitely many maximal ideals".

Some literature refers to a commutative semi-local ring in general as a quasi-semi-local ring, using semi-local ring to refer to a Noetherian ring with finitely many maximal ideals.

A semi-local ring is thus more general than a local ring, which has only one maximal (right/left/two-sided) ideal.

== Examples ==
- Any right or left Artinian ring, any serial ring, and any semiperfect ring is semi-local.
- The quotient $\mathbb{Z}/m\mathbb{Z}$ is a semi-local ring. In particular, if $m$ is a prime power, then $\mathbb{Z}/m\mathbb{Z}$ is a local ring.
- A finite direct sum of fields $\bigoplus_{i=1}^n{F_i}$ is a semi-local ring.
- In the case of commutative rings with unity, this example is prototypical in the following sense: the Chinese remainder theorem shows that for a semi-local commutative ring R with unit and maximal ideals m_{1}, ..., m_{n}

$$R/\bigcap_{i=1}^n m_i\cong\bigoplus_{i=1}^n R/m_i\,$$.
(The map is the natural projection). The right hand side is a direct sum of fields. Here we note that ∩_{i} m_{i}=J(R), and we see that R/J(R) is indeed a semisimple ring.

- The classical ring of quotients for any commutative Noetherian ring is a semilocal ring.
- The endomorphism ring of an Artinian module is a semilocal ring.
- Semi-local rings occur for example in algebraic geometry when a (commutative) ring R is localized with respect to the multiplicatively closed subset S = ∩ (R \ p_{i}), where the p_{i} are finitely many prime ideals.
