= Top (algebra) =

In the context of a module M over a ring R, the top of M is the largest semisimple quotient module of M if it exists.

For finite-dimensional k-algebras (k a field) R, if rad(M) denotes the intersection of all proper maximal submodules of M (the radical of the module), then the top of M is M/rad(M). In the case of local rings with maximal ideal P, the top of M is M/PM. In general if R is a semilocal ring (=semi-artinian ring), that is, if R/Rad(R) is an Artinian ring, where Rad(R) is the Jacobson radical of R, then M/rad(M) is a semisimple module and is the top of M. This includes the cases of local rings and finite dimensional algebras over fields.

== See also ==
- Projective cover
- Radical of a module
- Socle (mathematics)
