= Schanuel's lemma =

In mathematics, especially in the area of algebra known as module theory, Schanuel's lemma, named after Stephen Schanuel, allows one to compare how far modules depart from being projective. It is useful in defining the Heller operator in the stable category, and in giving elementary descriptions of dimension shifting.

== Statement ==
Schanuel's lemma is the following statement:

Let $R$ be a ring with identity. If $0\rightarrow K \rightarrow P \rightarrow M \rightarrow 0$ and $0 \rightarrow K' \rightarrow P' \rightarrow M \rightarrow 0$ are short exact sequences of $R$-modules and $P$ and $P'$ are projective, then $K \oplus P'$ is isomorphic to $K' \oplus P$.

== Proof ==
Define the following submodule of $P \oplus P'$, where $\phi \colon P \to M$ and $\phi' \colon P' \to M$:

$$X = \{ (p,q) \in P \oplus P' : \phi(p) = \phi'(q) \}.$$

The map $\pi \colon X \to P$, where $\pi$ is defined as the projection of the first coordinate of $X$ into $P$, is surjective. Since $\phi'$ is surjective, for any $p \in P$, one may find a $q \in P'$ such that $\phi(p) = \phi'(q)$. This gives $(p,q) \in X$ with $\pi(p,q) = p$. Now examine the kernel of the map $\pi$:

$$\begin{align}
\ker \pi &= \{ (0,q): (0,q) \in X \} \\
& = \{ (0,q): \phi'(q) =0 \} \\
& \cong \ker \phi' \cong K'.
\end{align}$$

We may conclude that there is a short exact sequence

$$0 \rightarrow K' \rightarrow X \rightarrow P \rightarrow 0.$$

Since $P$ is projective this sequence splits, so $X \cong K' \oplus P$. Similarly, we can write another map $\pi' \colon X \to P'$, and the same argument as above shows that there is another short exact sequence

$$0 \rightarrow K \rightarrow X \rightarrow P' \rightarrow 0,$$

and so $X \cong P' \oplus K$. Combining the two equivalences for $X$ gives the desired result.

== Long exact sequences ==
The above argument may also be generalized to long exact sequences.

== Origins ==
Stephen Schanuel discovered the argument in Irving Kaplansky's homological algebra course at the University of Chicago in Autumn of 1958. Kaplansky writes:

Early in the course I formed a one-step projective resolution of a module, and remarked that if the kernel was projective in one resolution it was projective in all. I added that, although the statement was so simple and straightforward, it would be a while before we proved it. Steve Schanuel spoke up and told me and the class that it was quite easy, and thereupon sketched what has come to be known as "Schanuel's lemma."
