= W. Dale Brownawell =

American mathematician

Woodrow Dale Brownawell (born April 21, 1942) is an American mathematician who has performed research in number theory and algebraic geometry. He is a Distinguished Professor emeritus at Pennsylvania State University, and is particularly known for his proof of explicit degree bounds that can be used to turn Hilbert's Nullstellensatz into an effective algorithm.

Brownawell was born in Grundy County, Missouri; his father was a farmer and train inspector. He earned a double baccalaureate in German and mathematics (with highest distinction) in 1964 from the University of Kansas, and after studying for a year at the University of Hamburg (at which he met Eva, the woman he later married) he returned to the US for graduate study at Cornell University. His graduate advisor, Stephen Schanuel, moved to Stony Brook University in 1969, and Brownawell followed him there for a year, but earned his Ph.D. from Cornell in 1970. That year, he joined the Penn State faculty, and he remained there until his retirement in 2013.

Brownawell and Michel Waldschmidt shared the 1986 Hardy–Ramanujan Prize for their independent proofs that at least one of the two numbers $e^e$ and $e^{e^2}$ is a transcendental number; here $e$ denotes Euler's number, approximately 2.718. In 2004, a conference at the University of Waterloo was held in honor of Brownawell's 60th birthday. In 2012, he became one of the inaugural fellows of the American Mathematical Society.
