= Theorem of transition =

Theorem about commutative rings and subrings

In algebra, the theorem of transition is said to hold between commutative rings $A \subset B$ if

1. $B$ dominates $A$; i.e., for each proper ideal I of A, $IB$ is proper and for each maximal ideal $\mathfrak n$ of B, $\mathfrak n \cap A$ is maximal
2. for each maximal ideal $\mathfrak m$ and $\mathfrak m$-primary ideal $Q$ of $A$, $\operatorname{length}_B (B/ Q B)$ is finite and moreover
  $$\operatorname{length}_B (B/ Q B) = \operatorname{length}_B (B/ \mathfrak{m} B) \operatorname{length}_A(A/Q).$$

Given commutative rings $A \subset B$ such that $B$ dominates $A$ and for each maximal ideal $\mathfrak m$ of $A$ such that $\operatorname{length}_B (B/ \mathfrak{m} B)$ is finite, the natural inclusion $A \to B$ is a faithfully flat ring homomorphism if and only if the theorem of transition holds between $A \subset B$.
