= Hopkins–Levitzki theorem =

In abstract algebra, in particular ring theory, the Akizuki–Hopkins–Levitzki theorem connects the descending chain condition and ascending chain condition in modules over semiprimary rings. A ring R (with 1) is called semiprimary if R/J(R) is semisimple and J(R) is a nilpotent ideal, where J(R) denotes the Jacobson radical. The theorem states that if R is a semiprimary ring and M is an R-module, the three module conditions Noetherian, Artinian and "has a composition series" are equivalent. Without the semiprimary condition, it is only true that M has a composition series if and only if M is both Noetherian and Artinian.

The theorem takes its current form from a paper by Charles Hopkins (a former doctoral student of George Abram Miller) and a paper by Jacob Levitzki, both in 1939. For this reason it is often cited as the Hopkins–Levitzki theorem. However Yasuo Akizuki is sometimes included since he proved the result for commutative rings a few years earlier, in 1935.

Since it is known that right Artinian rings are semiprimary, a direct corollary of the theorem is: a right Artinian ring is also right Noetherian. The analogous statement for left Artinian rings holds as well. This is not true in general for Artinian modules, because there are examples of Artinian modules which are not Noetherian.

Another direct corollary is that if R is right Artinian, then R is left Artinian if and only if it is left Noetherian.

== Sketch of proof ==
Here is the proof of the following: Let R be a semiprimary ring and M a left R-module. If M is either Artinian or Noetherian, then M has a composition series. (The converse of this is true over any ring.)

Let J be the radical of R. Set $F_i = J^{i-1}M/J^iM$. The R-module $F_i$ may then be viewed as an $R/J$-module because J is contained in the annihilator of $F_i$. Each $F_i$ is a semisimple $R/J$-module, because $R/J$ is a semisimple ring. Furthermore, since J is nilpotent, only finitely many of the $F_i$ are nonzero. If M is Artinian (or Noetherian), then $F_i$ has a finite composition series. Stacking the composition series from the $F_i$ end to end, we obtain a composition series for M.

== In Grothendieck categories ==
Several generalizations and extensions of the theorem exist. One concerns Grothendieck categories: if G is a Grothendieck category with an Artinian generator, then every Artinian object in G is Noetherian.
