= Finite algebra =

In abstract algebra, an associative algebra $A$ over a ring $R$ is called finite if it is finitely generated as an $R$-module. An $R$-algebra can be thought as a homomorphism of rings $f: R \to A$, in this case $f$ is called a finite morphism if $A$ is a finite $R$-algebra.

Being a finite algebra is a stronger condition than being an algebra of finite type.

== Finite morphisms in algebraic geometry ==
This concept is closely related to that of finite morphism in algebraic geometry; in the simplest case of affine varieties, given two affine varieties $V\subseteq\mathbb{A}^n$, $W\subseteq\mathbb{A}^m$ and a dominant regular map $\phi: V\to W$, the induced homomorphism of $k$-algebras $\phi^* : \Gamma(W)\to\Gamma(V)$ defined by $\phi^*f=f\circ\phi$ turns $\Gamma(V)$ into a $\Gamma(W)$-algebra:

$\phi$ is a finite morphism of affine varieties if $\phi^* : \Gamma(W)\to\Gamma(V)$ is a finite morphism of $k$-algebras.

The generalisation to schemes can be found in the article on finite morphisms.

== See also ==
- Finite morphism
- Finitely generated algebra
- Finitely generated module
