= Normally flat ring =

Local ring in algebraic geometry

In algebraic geometry, a normally flat ring along a proper ideal $I$ is a local ring $A$ such that $I^n/I^{n+1}$ is flat over $A/I$ for all $n \geq 0$.

The notion was introduced by Hironaka in his proof of the resolution of singularities as a refinement of equimultiplicity and was later generalized by Grothendieck and others.
