= Artinian module =

Module which satisfies the descending chain condition on submodules

In mathematics, specifically abstract algebra, an Artinian module is a module that satisfies the descending chain condition on its poset of submodules. They are for modules what Artinian rings are for rings, and a ring is Artinian if and only if it is an Artinian module over itself (with left or right multiplication). Both concepts are named for Emil Artin.

In the presence of the axiom of (dependent) choice, the descending chain condition becomes equivalent to the minimum condition, and so that may be used in the definition instead.

Like Noetherian modules, Artinian modules enjoy the following heredity property:

- If M is an Artinian R-module, then so is any submodule and any quotient of M.

The converse also holds:

- If M is any R-module and N any Artinian submodule such that M/N is Artinian, then M is Artinian.

As a consequence, any finitely-generated module over an Artinian ring is Artinian. Since an Artinian ring is also a Noetherian ring, and finitely-generated modules over a Noetherian ring are Noetherian, it is true that for an Artinian ring R, any finitely-generated R-module is both Noetherian and Artinian, and is said to be of finite length. It also follows that any finitely generated Artinian module is Noetherian even without the assumption of R being Artinian. However, if R is not Artinian and M is not finitely-generated, there are counterexamples.

== Left and right Artinian rings, modules and bimodules ==
The ring R can be considered as a right module, where the action is the natural one given by the ring multiplication on the right. R is called right Artinian when this right module R is an Artinian module. The definition of "left Artinian ring" is done analogously. For noncommutative rings this distinction is necessary, because it is possible for a ring to be Artinian on one side but not the other.

The left-right adjectives are not normally necessary for modules, because the module M is usually given as a left or right R-module at the outset. However, it is possible that M may have both a left and right R-module structure, and then calling M Artinian is ambiguous, and it becomes necessary to clarify which module structure is Artinian. To separate the properties of the two structures, one can abuse terminology and refer to M as left Artinian or right Artinian when, strictly speaking, it is correct to say that M, with its left R-module structure, is Artinian.

The occurrence of modules with a left and right structure is not unusual: for example R itself has a left and right R-module structure. In fact this is an example of a bimodule, and it may be possible for an abelian group M to be made into a left-R, right-S bimodule for a different ring S. Indeed, for any right module M, it is automatically a left module over the ring of integers Z, and moreover is a Z-R-bimodule. For example, consider the rational numbers Q as a Z-Q-bimodule in the natural way. Then Q is not Artinian as a left Z-module, but it is Artinian as a right Q-module.

The Artinian condition can be defined on bimodule structures as well: an Artinian bimodule is a bimodule whose poset of sub-bimodules satisfies the descending chain condition. Since a sub-bimodule of an R-S-bimodule M is a fortiori a left R-module, if M considered as a left R-module were Artinian, then M is automatically an Artinian bimodule. It may happen, however, that a bimodule is Artinian without its left or right structures being Artinian, as the following example will show.

Example: It is well known that a simple ring is left Artinian if and only if it is right Artinian, in which case it is a semisimple ring. Let R be a simple ring which is not right Artinian. Then it is also not left Artinian. Considering R as an R-R-bimodule in the natural way, its sub-bimodules are exactly the ideals of R. Since R is simple there are only two: R and the zero ideal. Thus the bimodule R is Artinian as a bimodule, but not Artinian as a left or right R-module over itself.

== Relation to the Noetherian condition ==
Unlike the case of rings, there are Artinian modules which are not Noetherian modules. For example, consider the p-primary component of $\mathbb{Q}/\mathbb{Z}$, that is $\mathbb{Z}[1/p] / \mathbb{Z}$, which is isomorphic to the p-quasicyclic group $\mathbb{Z}(p^\infty)$, regarded as $\mathbb{Z}$-module. The chain $\langle 1/p \rangle \subset \langle 1/p^2 \rangle \subset \langle 1/p^3 \rangle \subset \cdots$ does not terminate, so $\mathbb{Z}(p^\infty)$ (and therefore $\mathbb{Q}/\mathbb{Z}$) is not Noetherian. Yet every descending chain of submodules terminates, since any proper submodule has the form $\langle 1/n \rangle$ for some integer $n$ and is therefore a finite set; so $\mathbb{Z}(p^\infty)$ is Artinian.

Note that $\mathbb{Z}[1/p] / \mathbb{Z}$ is also a faithful $\mathbb{Z}$-module. So, this also provides an example of a faithful Artinian module over a non-Artinian ring. This does not happen for Noetherian case; if M is a faithful Noetherian module over A then A is Noetherian as well.

Over a commutative ring, every cyclic Artinian module is also Noetherian, but over noncommutative rings cyclic Artinian modules can have uncountable length as shown in the article of Hartley and summarized in the Paul Cohn article dedicated to Hartley's memory.

Another relevant result is the Akizuki–Hopkins–Levitzki theorem, which states that the Artinian and Noetherian conditions are equivalent for modules over a semiprimary ring.

== See also ==
- Composition series
- Krull dimension
