= Projective cover =

In the branch of abstract mathematics called category theory, a projective cover of an object M is in a sense the best approximation of M by a projective object P. Projective covers are the dual of injective envelopes.

== Definition ==
Let $\mathcal{C}$ be a category and M an object in $\mathcal{C}$. A projective cover is a pair (P,p), with P a projective object in $\mathcal{C}$ and p a superfluous epimorphism in Hom(P, M).

If R is a ring, then in the category of R-modules, a superfluous epimorphism is then an epimorphism $p : P \to M$ such that the kernel of p is a superfluous submodule of P.

== Properties ==
Projective covers and their superfluous epimorphisms, when they exist, are unique up to isomorphism. The isomorphism need not be unique, however, since the projective property is not a full fledged universal property.

The main effect of p having a superfluous kernel is the following: if N is any proper submodule of P, then $p(N) \ne M$. Informally speaking, this shows the superfluous kernel causes P to cover M optimally, that is, no submodule of P would suffice. This does not depend upon the projectivity of P: it is true of all superfluous epimorphisms.

If (P,p) is a projective cover of M, and P' is another projective module with an epimorphism $p':P'\rightarrow M$, then there is a split epimorphism α from P' to P such that $p\alpha=p'$

Unlike injective envelopes and flat covers, which exist for every left (right) R-module regardless of the ring R, left (right) R-modules do not in general have projective covers. A ring R is called left (right) perfect if every left (right) R-module has a projective cover in R-Mod (Mod-R).

A ring is called semiperfect if every finitely generated left (right) R-module has a projective cover in R-Mod (Mod-R). "Semiperfect" is a left-right symmetric property.

A ring is called lift/rad if idempotents lift from R/J to R, where J is the Jacobson radical of R. The property of being lift/rad can be characterized in terms of projective covers: R is lift/rad if and only if direct summands of the R module R/J (as a right or left module) have projective covers.

== Examples ==
In the category of R modules:

- If M is already a projective module, then the identity map from M to M is a superfluous epimorphism (its kernel being zero). Hence, projective modules always have projective covers.
- If J(R)=0, then a module M has a projective cover if and only if M is already projective.
- In the case that a module M is simple, then it is necessarily the top of its projective cover, if it exists.
- The injective envelope for a module always exists, however over certain rings modules may not have projective covers. For example, the natural map from Z onto Z/2Z is not a projective cover of the Z-module Z/2Z (which in fact has no projective cover). The class of rings which provides all of its right modules with projective covers is the class of right perfect rings.
- Any R-module M has a flat cover, which is equal to the projective cover if M has a projective cover.

== See also ==
- Projective resolution
