= Finite morphism =

Concept in algebraic geometry

In algebraic geometry, a finite morphism between two affine varieties $X, Y$ is a dense regular map which induces isomorphic inclusion $k\left[Y\right]\hookrightarrow k\left[X\right]$ between their coordinate rings, such that $k\left[X\right]$ is integral over $k\left[Y\right]$. This definition can be extended to the quasi-projective varieties, such that a regular map $f\colon X\to Y$ between quasiprojective varieties is finite if any point $y\in Y$ has an affine neighbourhood V such that $U=f^{-1}(V)$ is affine and $f\colon U\to V$ is a finite map (in view of the previous definition, because it is between affine varieties).

== Definition by schemes ==
A morphism f: X → Y of schemes is a finite morphism if Y has an open cover by affine schemes

$$V_i = \mbox{Spec} \; B_i$$

such that for each i,

$$f^{-1}(V_i) = U_i$$

is an open affine subscheme Spec A_{i}, and the restriction of f to U_{i}, which induces a ring homomorphism

$$B_i \rightarrow A_i,$$

makes A_{i} a finitely generated module over B_{i} (in other words, a finite B_{i}-algebra). One also says that X is finite over Y.

In fact, f is finite if and only if for every open affine subscheme V = Spec B in Y, the inverse image of V in X is affine, of the form Spec A, with A a finitely generated B-module.

For example, for any field k, $\text{Spec}(k[t,x]/(x^n-t)) \to \text{Spec}(k[t])$ is a finite morphism since $k[t,x]/(x^n-t) \cong k[t]\oplus k[t]\cdot x \oplus\cdots \oplus k[t]\cdot x^{n-1}$ as $k[t]$-modules. Geometrically, this is obviously finite since this is a ramified n-sheeted cover of the affine line which degenerates at the origin. By contrast, the inclusion of A^{1} − 0 into A^{1} is not finite. (Indeed, the Laurent polynomial ring k[y, y^{−1}] is not finitely generated as a module over k[y].) This restricts our geometric intuition to surjective families with finite fibers.

== Properties of finite morphisms ==
- The composition of two finite morphisms is finite.
- Any base change of a finite morphism f: X → Y is finite. That is, if g: Z → Y is any morphism of schemes, then the resulting morphism X ×_{Y} Z → Z is finite. This corresponds to the following algebraic statement: if A and C are (commutative) B-algebras, and A is finitely generated as a B-module, then the tensor product A ⊗_{B} C is finitely generated as a C-module. Indeed, the generators can be taken to be the elements a_{i} ⊗ 1, where a_{i} are the given generators of A as a B-module.
- Closed immersions are finite, as they are locally given by A → A/I, where I is the ideal (section of the ideal sheaf) corresponding to the closed subscheme.
- Finite morphisms are closed, hence (because of their stability under base change) proper. This follows from the going up theorem of Cohen-Seidenberg in commutative algebra.
- Finite morphisms have finite fibers (that is, they are quasi-finite). This follows from the fact that for a field k, every finite k-algebra is an Artinian ring. A related statement is that for a finite surjective morphism f: X → Y, X and Y have the same dimension.
- By Deligne, a morphism of schemes is finite if and only if it is proper and quasi-finite. This had been shown by Grothendieck if the morphism f: X → Y is locally of finite presentation, which follows from the other assumptions if Y is Noetherian.
- Finite morphisms are both projective and affine.

== See also ==
- Glossary of algebraic geometry
- Morphism of finite type
