= Torsion-free module =

Module over a ring

In algebra, a torsion-free module is a module over a ring such that zero is the only element annihilated by a regular element (non zero-divisor) of the ring. In other words, a module is torsion free if its torsion submodule contains only the zero element.

In integral domains the regular elements of the ring are its nonzero elements, so in this case a torsion-free module is one such that zero is the only element annihilated by some non-zero element of the ring. Some authors work only over integral domains and use this condition as the definition of a torsion-free module, but this does not work well over more general rings, for if the ring contains zero-divisors then the only module satisfying this condition is the zero module.

== Examples of torsion-free modules ==
Over a commutative ring R with total quotient ring K, a module M is torsion-free if and only if Tor_{1}(K/R,M) vanishes. Therefore flat modules, and in particular free and projective modules, are torsion-free, but the converse need not be true. An example of a torsion-free module that is not flat is the ideal (x, y) of the polynomial ring k[x, y] over a field k, interpreted as a module over k[x, y].

Any torsionless module over a domain is a torsion-free module, but the converse is not true, as Q is a torsion-free Z-module that is not torsionless.

== Structure of torsion-free modules ==
Over a Noetherian integral domain, torsion-free modules are the modules whose only associated prime is zero. More generally, over a Noetherian commutative ring the torsion-free modules are those modules all of whose associated primes are contained in the associated primes of the ring.

Over a Noetherian integrally closed domain, any finitely-generated torsion-free module has a free submodule such that the quotient by it is isomorphic to an ideal of the ring.

Over a Dedekind domain, a finitely-generated module is torsion-free if and only if it is projective, but is in general not free. Any such module is isomorphic to the sum of a finitely-generated free module and an ideal, and the class of the ideal is uniquely determined by the module.

Over a principal ideal domain, finitely-generated modules are torsion-free if and only if they are free.

== Torsion-free covers ==
Over an integral domain, every module M has a torsion-free cover F → M from a torsion-free module F onto M, with the properties that any other torsion-free module mapping onto M factors through F, and any endomorphism of F over M is an automorphism of F. Such a torsion-free cover of M is unique up to isomorphism. Torsion-free covers are closely related to flat covers.

== Torsion-free quasicoherent sheaves ==
A quasicoherent sheaf F over a scheme X is a sheaf of $\mathcal{O}_X$-modules such that for any open affine subscheme U = Spec(R) the restriction F|_{U} is associated to some module M over R. The sheaf F is said to be torsion-free if all those modules M are torsion-free over their respective rings. Alternatively, F is torsion-free if and only if it has no local torsion sections.

== See also ==
- Torsion (algebra)
- torsion-free abelian group
- torsion-free abelian group of rank 1; the classification theory exists for this class.
