= Flat cover =

In algebra, a flat cover of a module M over a ring is a surjective homomorphism from a flat module F to M that is in some sense minimal. Any module over a ring has a flat cover that is unique up to (non-unique) isomorphism. Flat covers are in some sense dual to injective hulls, and are related to projective covers and torsion-free covers.

== Definitions ==
The homomorphism F→M is defined to be a flat cover of M if it is surjective, F is flat, every homomorphism from flat module to M factors through F, and any map from F to F commuting with the map to M is an automorphism of F.

== History ==
While projective covers for modules do not always exist, it was speculated that for general rings, every module would have a flat cover. This flat cover conjecture was explicitly first stated in (Enochs 1981, p 196). The conjecture turned out to be true, resolved positively and proved simultaneously by Bican, El Bashir & Enochs (2001). This was preceded by important contributions by P. Eklof, J. Trlifaj and J. Xu.

== Minimal flat resolutions ==
Any module M over a ring has a resolution by flat modules

→ F_{2} → F_{1} → F_{0} → M → 0

such that each F_{n+1} is the flat cover of the kernel of F_{n} → F_{n−1}. Such a resolution is unique up to isomorphism, and is a minimal flat resolution in the sense that any flat resolution of M factors through it. Any homomorphism of modules extends to a homomorphism between the corresponding flat resolutions, though this extension is in general not unique.
