= Projective object =

Type of object in category theory

In category theory, the notion of a projective object generalizes the notion of a projective module. Projective objects in abelian categories are used in homological algebra. The dual notion of a projective object is that of an injective object.

== Definition ==
An object $P$ in a category $\mathcal{C}$ is projective if for any epimorphism $e:E\twoheadrightarrow X$ and morphism $f:P\to X$, there is a morphism $\overline{f}:P\to E$ such that $e\circ \overline{f}=f$, i.e. the following diagram commutes:

That is, every morphism $P\to X$ factors through every epimorphism $E\twoheadrightarrow X$.

If C is locally small, i.e., in particular $\operatorname{Hom}_C(P, X)$ is a set for any object X in C, this definition is equivalent to the condition that the hom functor (also known as corepresentable functor)

$$\operatorname{Hom}(P,-)\colon\mathcal{C}\to\mathbf{Set}$$

preserves epimorphisms.

=== Projective objects in abelian categories ===
If the category C is an abelian category such as, for example, the category of abelian groups, then P is projective if and only if

$$\operatorname{Hom}(P,-)\colon\mathcal{C}\to\mathbf{Ab}$$

is an exact functor, where Ab is the category of abelian groups.

An abelian category $\mathcal{A}$ is said to have enough projectives if, for every object $A$ of $\mathcal{A}$, there is a projective object $P$ of $\mathcal{A}$ and an epimorphism from P to A or, equivalently, a short exact sequence

$$0 \to K \to P \to A \to 0.$$

The purpose of this definition is to ensure that any object A admits a projective resolution, i.e., a (long) exact sequence

$$\dots P_2 \to P_1 \to P_0 \to A \to 0$$

where the objects $P_0, P_1, \dots$ are projective.

=== Projectivity with respect to restricted classes ===
Semadeni (1963) discusses the notion of projective (and dually injective) objects relative to a so-called bicategory, which consists of a pair of subcategories of "injections" and "surjections" in the given category C. These subcategories are subject to certain formal properties including the requirement that any surjection is an epimorphism. A projective object (relative to the fixed class of surjections) is then an object P so that Hom(P, −) turns the fixed class of surjections (as opposed to all epimorphisms) into surjections of sets (in the usual sense).

== Properties ==
- The coproduct of two projective objects is projective.
- A retract of a projective object is projective.

== Examples ==
The statement that all sets are projective is equivalent to the axiom of choice.

The projective objects in the category of abelian groups are the free abelian groups.

Let $R$ be a ring with identity. Consider the (abelian) category $R$-Mod of left $R$-modules. The projective objects in $R$-Mod are precisely the projective left R-modules. Consequently, $R$ is itself a projective object in $R$-Mod. Dually, the injective objects in $R$-Mod are exactly the injective left R-modules.

The category of left (right) $R$-modules also has enough projectives. This is true since, for every left (right) $R$-module $M$, we can take $F$ to be the free (and hence projective) $R$-module generated by a generating set $X$ for $M$ (for example we can take $X$ to be $M$). Then the canonical projection $\pi\colon F\to M$ is the required surjection.

The projective objects in the category of compact Hausdorff spaces are precisely the extremally disconnected spaces. This result is due to Gleason (1958), with a simplified proof given by Rainwater (1959).

In the category of Banach spaces and contractions (i.e., functionals whose norm is at most 1), the epimorphisms are precisely the maps with dense image. Wiweger (1969) shows that the zero space is the only projective object in this category. There are non-trivial spaces, though, which are projective with respect to the class of surjective contractions. In the category of normed vector spaces with contractions (and surjective maps as "surjections"), the projective objects are precisely the $l^1$-spaces.

$$l^1(S) = \{(x_s)_{s \in S}, \sum_{s \in S} ||x_s|| < \infty \}.$$
