= Stephen Schanuel =

American mathematician

- Born: 14 July 1933; St. Louis, Missouri, U.S.
- Died: 21 July 2014 (aged 81); Jacksonville, Florida, U.S.
- Education: Columbia University
- Known for: Schanuel's conjecture Schanuel's lemma
- Scientific career
- Fields: Mathematics
- Workplaces: University at Buffalo
- Doctoral advisor: Serge Lang
- Doctoral students: W. Dale Brownawell

Stephen H. Schanuel (14 July 1933 – 21 July 2014) was an American mathematician working in the fields of abstract algebra and category theory, number theory, and measure theory.

== Life ==
While he was a graduate student at University of Chicago, he discovered Schanuel's lemma, an essential lemma in homological algebra. Schanuel received his Ph.D. in mathematics from Columbia University in 1963, under the supervision of Serge Lang.

== Work ==
Shortly thereafter he stated a conjecture in the field of transcendental number theory, which remains an important open problem to this day. Schanuel was a professor emeritus of mathematics at University at Buffalo.

== Books ==
- Lawvere, F. William; Schanuel, Stephen Hoel (2009) [1997]. Conceptual Mathematics: A First Introduction to Categories (2nd ed.). Cambridge University Press. ISBN 978-0-521-89485-2.
