= Split exact sequence =

Type of short exact sequence in mathematics

In mathematics, a split exact sequence is a short exact sequence in which the middle term is built out of the two outer terms in the simplest possible way.

== Equivalent characterizations ==
A short exact sequence of abelian groups or of modules over a fixed ring, or more generally of objects in an abelian category

$$0 \to A \mathrel{\stackrel{a}{\to}} B \mathrel{\stackrel{b}{\to}} C \to 0$$

is called split exact if it is isomorphic to the exact sequence where the middle term is the direct sum of the outer ones:

$$0 \to A \mathrel{\stackrel{i}{\to}} A \oplus C \mathrel{\stackrel{p}{\to}} C \to 0$$

with $i: A \to A \oplus C$ being the natural inclusion of A into the direct sum, and $p: A \oplus C \to C$ denoting the natural projection of the direct sum onto the second summand. The requirement that the sequence is isomorphic means that there is an isomorphism $f : B \to A \oplus C$ such that the composite $f \circ a$ is the natural inclusion $i: A \to A \oplus C$ and such that the composite $p \circ f$ equals b. This can be summarized by a commutative diagram as:

The splitting lemma provides further equivalent characterizations of split exact sequences. The sequence

$$0 \to A \mathrel{\stackrel{a}{\to}} B \mathrel{\stackrel{b}{\to}} C \to 0$$

is split exact if and only if there exists $r : C \to B$ such that $b \circ r = 1_C$, which is the case if and only if there exists $s : B \to A$ such that $s \circ a = 1_A$.

== Examples ==
A trivial example of a split short exact sequence is

$$0 \to M_1 \mathrel{\stackrel{q}{\to}} M_1\oplus M_2 \mathrel{\stackrel{p}{\to}} M_2 \to 0$$

where $M_1, M_2$ are R-modules, $q$ is the canonical injection and $p$ is the canonical projection.

Any short exact sequence of vector spaces is split exact. This is a rephrasing of the fact that any set of linearly independent vectors in a vector space can be extended to a basis.

The exact sequence $0 \to \mathbf{Z}\mathrel{\stackrel{2}{\to}} \mathbf{Z}\to \mathbf{Z}/ 2\mathbf{Z} \to 0$ (where the first map is multiplication by 2) is not split exact.

== Related notions ==
Pure exact sequences can be characterized as the filtered colimits of split exact sequences.

== Terminology in more general contexts ==
In the context of short exact sequences of (not necessarily abelian) groups or in other settings, the term split exact sequence is used in two different ways by different people. Some people mean a short exact sequence that right-splits (thus corresponding to a semidirect product) and some people mean a short exact sequence that left-splits (which implies it right-splits, and corresponds to a direct product).

== Sources ==
- Fuchs, László (2015), Abelian Groups, Springer Monographs in Mathematics, Springer, ISBN 9783319194226
- Sharp, R. Y., Rodney (2001), Steps in Commutative Algebra, 2nd ed., London Mathematical Society Student Texts, Cambridge University Press, ISBN 0521646235
