= Noetherian module =

Abstract algebra module

In abstract algebra, a Noetherian module is a module that satisfies the ascending chain condition on its submodules, where the submodules are partially ordered by inclusion.

Historically, Hilbert was the first mathematician to work with the properties of finitely generated submodules. He proved an important theorem known as Hilbert's basis theorem which says that any ideal in the multivariate polynomial ring of an arbitrary field is finitely generated. However, the property is named after Emmy Noether who was the first one to discover the true importance of the property.

== Characterizations and properties ==
In the presence of the axiom of choice, two other characterizations are possible:

- Any nonempty set S of submodules of the module has a maximal element (with respect to set inclusion). This is known as the maximum condition.
- All of the submodules of the module are finitely generated.

If M is a module and K a submodule, then M is Noetherian if and only if K and M/K are Noetherian. This is in contrast to the general situation with finitely generated modules: a submodule of a finitely generated module need not be finitely generated.

== Examples ==
- The integers, considered as a module over the ring of integers, is a Noetherian module.
- If R = M_{n}(F) is the full matrix ring over a field, and M = M_{n 1}(F) is the set of column vectors over F, then M can be made into a module using matrix multiplication by elements of R on the left of elements of M. This is a Noetherian module.
- Any module that is finite as a set is Noetherian.
- Any finitely generated right module over a right Noetherian ring is a Noetherian module.

== Use in other structures ==
A right Noetherian ring R is, by definition, a Noetherian right R-module over itself using multiplication on the right. Likewise a ring is called left Noetherian ring when R is Noetherian considered as a left R-module. When R is a commutative ring the left-right adjectives may be dropped as they are unnecessary. Also, if R is Noetherian on both sides, it is customary to call it Noetherian and not "left and right Noetherian".

The Noetherian condition can also be defined on bimodule structures as well: a Noetherian bimodule is a bimodule whose poset of sub-bimodules satisfies the ascending chain condition. Since a sub-bimodule of an R-S bimodule M is in particular a left R-module, if M considered as a left R-module were Noetherian, then M is automatically a Noetherian bimodule. It may happen, however, that a bimodule is Noetherian without its left or right structures being Noetherian.

== See also ==
- Artinian module
- Ascending/descending chain condition
- Composition series
- Finitely generated module
- Krull dimension
