= Finitely generated module =

In algebra, module with a finite generating set

In mathematics, a finitely generated module is a module that has a finite generating set. A finitely generated module over a ring R may also be called a finite R-module, finite over R, or a module of finite type.

Related concepts include finitely cogenerated modules, finitely presented modules, finitely related modules and coherent modules all of which are defined below. Over a Noetherian ring the concepts of finitely generated, finitely presented and coherent modules coincide.

A finitely generated module over a field is simply a finite-dimensional vector space, and a finitely generated module over the integers is simply a finitely generated abelian group.

== Definition ==
The left R-module M is finitely generated if there exist a_{1}, a_{2}, ..., a_{n} in M such that for any x in M, there exist r_{1}, r_{2}, ..., r_{n} in R with x = r_{1}a_{1} + r_{2}a_{2} + ... + r_{n}a_{n}.

The set {a_{1}, a_{2}, ..., a_{n}} is referred to as a generating set of M in this case. A finite generating set need not be a basis, since it need not be linearly independent over R. What is true is: M is finitely generated if and only if there is a surjective R-linear map:

$$R^n \to M$$

for some n; in other words, M is a quotient of a free module of finite rank.

If a set S generates a module that is finitely generated, then there is a finite generating set that is included in S, since only finitely many elements in S are needed to express the generators in any finite generating set, and these finitely many elements form a generating set. However, it may occur that S does not contain any finite generating set of minimal cardinality. For example the set of the prime numbers is a generating set of $\mathbb Z$ viewed as $\mathbb Z$-module, and a generating set formed from prime numbers has at least two elements, while the singleton{1} is also a generating set.

In the case where the module M is a vector space over a field R, and the generating set is linearly independent, n is well-defined and is referred to as the dimension of M (well-defined means that any linearly independent generating set has n elements: this is the dimension theorem for vector spaces).

Any module is the union of the directed set of its finitely generated submodules.

A module M is finitely generated if and only if any increasing chain M_{i} of submodules with union M stabilizes: i.e., there is some i such that M_{i} = M. This fact with Zorn's lemma implies that every nonzero finitely generated module admits maximal submodules. If any increasing chain of submodules stabilizes (i.e., any submodule is finitely generated), then the module M is called a Noetherian module.

== Examples ==
- If a module is generated by one element, it is called a cyclic module.
- Let R be an integral domain with K its field of fractions. Then every finitely generated R-submodule I of K is a fractional ideal: that is, there is some nonzero r in R such that rI is contained in R. Indeed, one can take r to be the product of the denominators of the generators of I. If R is Noetherian, then every fractional ideal arises in this way.
- Finitely generated modules over the ring of integers Z coincide with the finitely generated abelian groups. (These are completely classified by the structure theorem, taking Z as the principal ideal domain.)
- Finitely generated (say, left) modules over a division ring are precisely finite dimensional vector spaces (over the division ring).

== Some facts ==
Every homomorphic image of a finitely generated module is finitely generated. In general, submodules of finitely generated modules need not be finitely generated. As an example, consider the ring R = Z[X_{1}, X_{2}, ...] of all polynomials in countably many variables. R itself is a finitely generated R-module (with {1} as generating set). Consider the submodule K consisting of all those polynomials with zero constant term. Since every polynomial contains only finitely many terms whose coefficients are non-zero, the R-module K is not finitely generated.

In general, a module is said to be Noetherian if every submodule is finitely generated. A finitely generated module over a Noetherian ring is a Noetherian module (and indeed this property characterizes Noetherian rings): A module over a Noetherian ring is finitely generated if and only if it is a Noetherian module. This resembles, but is not exactly Hilbert's basis theorem, which states that the polynomial ring R[X] over a Noetherian ring R is Noetherian. Both facts imply that a finitely generated commutative algebra over a Noetherian ring is again a Noetherian ring.

More generally, an algebra (e.g., ring) that is a finitely generated module is a finitely generated algebra. Conversely, if a finitely generated algebra is integral (over the coefficient ring), then it is finitely generated module. (See integral element for more.)

Let 0 → M′ → M → M′′ → 0 be an exact sequence of modules. Then M is finitely generated if M′, M′′ are finitely generated. There are some partial converses to this. If M is finitely generated and M′′ is finitely presented (which is stronger than finitely generated; see below), then M′ is finitely generated. Also, M is Noetherian (resp. Artinian) if and only if M′, M′′ are Noetherian (resp. Artinian).

Let B be a ring and A its subring such that B is a faithfully flat right A-module. Then a left A-module F is finitely generated (resp. finitely presented) if and only if the B-module B ⊗_{A} F is finitely generated (resp. finitely presented).

== Finitely generated modules over a commutative ring ==
For finitely generated modules over a commutative ring R, Nakayama's lemma is fundamental. Sometimes, the lemma allows one to prove finite dimensional vector spaces phenomena for finitely generated modules. For example, if f : M → M is a surjective R-endomorphism of a finitely generated module M, then f is also injective, and hence is an automorphism of M. This says simply that M is a Hopfian module. Similarly, an Artinian module M is coHopfian: any injective endomorphism f is also a surjective endomorphism. The Forster–Swan theorem gives an upper bound for the minimal number of generators of a finitely generated module M over a commutative Noetherian ring.

Any R-module is an inductive limit of finitely generated R-submodules. This is useful for weakening an assumption to the finite case (e.g., the characterization of flatness with the Tor functor).

An example of a link between finite generation and integral elements can be found in commutative algebras. To say that a commutative algebra A is a finitely generated ring over R means that there exists a set of elements G = {x_{1}, ..., x_{n}} of A such that the smallest subring of A containing G and R is A itself. Because the ring product may be used to combine elements, more than just R-linear combinations of elements of G are generated. For example, a polynomial ring R[x] is finitely generated by {1, x} as a ring, but not as a module. If A is a commutative algebra (with unity) over R, then the following two statements are equivalent:

- A is a finitely generated R module.
- A is both a finitely generated ring over R and an integral extension of R.

== Generic rank ==
Let M be a finitely generated module over an integral domain A with the field of fractions K. Then the dimension $\operatorname{dim}_K (M \otimes_A K)$ is called the generic rank of M over A. This number is the same as the number of maximal A-linearly independent vectors in M or equivalently the rank of a maximal free submodule of M (cf. Rank of an abelian group). Since $(M/F)_{(0)} = M_{(0)}/F_{(0)} = 0$, $M/F$ is a torsion module. When A is Noetherian, by generic freeness, there is an element f (depending on M) such that $M[f^{-1}]$ is a free $A[f^{-1}]$-module. Then the rank of this free module is the generic rank of M.

Now suppose the integral domain A is an $\mathbb{N}$-graded algebra over a field k generated by finitely many homogeneous elements of degrees $d_i$. Suppose M is graded as well and let $P_M(t) = \sum (\operatorname{dim}_k M_n) t^n$ be the Poincaré series of M. By the Hilbert–Serre theorem, there is a polynomial F such that $P_M(t) = F(t) \prod (1-t^{d_i})^{-1}$. Then $F(1)$ is the generic rank of M.

A finitely generated module over a principal ideal domain is torsion-free if and only if it is free. This is a consequence of the structure theorem for finitely generated modules over a principal ideal domain, the basic form of which says a finitely generated module over a PID is a direct sum of a torsion module and a free module. But it can also be shown directly as follows: let M be a torsion-free finitely generated module over a PID A and F a maximal free submodule. Let f be in A such that $f M \subset F$. Then $fM$ is free since it is a submodule of a free module and A is a PID. But now $f: M \to fM$ is an isomorphism since M is torsion-free.

By the same argument as above, a finitely generated module over a Dedekind domain A (or more generally a semi-hereditary ring) is torsion-free if and only if it is projective; consequently, a finitely generated module over A is a direct sum of a torsion module and a projective module. A finitely generated projective module over a Noetherian integral domain has constant rank and so the generic rank of a finitely generated module over A is the rank of its projective part.

== Equivalent definitions and finitely cogenerated modules ==
The following conditions are equivalent to M being finitely generated (f.g.):

- For any family of submodules {N_{i} | i ∈ I} in M, if $\sum_{i\in I}N_i=M\,$, then $\sum_{i\in F}N_i=M\,$ for some finite subset F of I.
- For any chain of submodules {N_{i} | i ∈ I} in M, if $\bigcup_{i\in I}N_i=M\,$, then N_{i} = M for some i in I.
- If $\phi:\bigoplus_{i\in I}R\to M\,$ is an epimorphism, then the restriction $\phi:\bigoplus_{i\in F}R\to M\,$ is an epimorphism for some finite subset F of I.

From these conditions it is easy to see that being finitely generated is a property preserved by Morita equivalence. The conditions are also convenient to define a dual notion of a finitely cogenerated module M. The following conditions are equivalent to a module being finitely cogenerated (f.cog.):

- For any family of submodules {N_{i} | i ∈ I} in M, if $\bigcap_{i\in I}N_i=\{0\}\,$, then $\bigcap_{i\in F}N_i=\{0\}\,$ for some finite subset F of I.
- For any chain of submodules {N_{i} | i ∈ I} in M, if $\bigcap_{i\in I}N_i=\{0\}\,$, then N_{i} = {0} for some i in I.
- If $\phi:M\to \prod_{i\in I}N_i\,$ is a monomorphism, where each $N_i$ is an R module, then $\phi:M\to \prod_{i\in F}N_i\,$ is a monomorphism for some finite subset F of I.

Both f.g. modules and f.cog. modules have interesting relationships to Noetherian and Artinian modules, and the Jacobson radical J(M) and socle soc(M) of a module. The following facts illustrate the duality between the two conditions. For a module M:

- M is Noetherian if and only if every submodule N of M is f.g.
- M is Artinian if and only if every quotient module M/N is f.cog.
- M is f.g. if and only if J(M) is a superfluous submodule of M, and M/J(M) is f.g.
- M is f.cog. if and only if soc(M) is an essential submodule of M, and soc(M) is f.g.
- If M is a semisimple module (such as soc(N) for any module N), it is f.g. if and only if f.cog.
- If M is f.g. and nonzero, then M has a maximal submodule and any quotient module M/N is f.g.
- If M is f.cog. and nonzero, then M has a minimal submodule, and any submodule N of M is f.cog.
- If N and M/N are f.g. then so is M. The same is true if "f.g." is replaced with "f.cog."

Finitely cogenerated modules must have finite uniform dimension. This is easily seen by applying the characterization using the finitely generated essential socle. Somewhat asymmetrically, finitely generated modules do not necessarily have finite uniform dimension. For example, an infinite direct product of nonzero rings is a finitely generated (cyclic!) module over itself, however it clearly contains an infinite direct sum of nonzero submodules. Finitely generated modules do not necessarily have finite co-uniform dimension either: any ring R with unity such that R/J(R) is not a semisimple ring is a counterexample.

== Finitely presented, finitely related, and coherent modules ==
Another formulation is this: a finitely generated module M is one for which there is an epimorphism mapping R^{k} onto M :

f : R^{k} → M.

Suppose now there is an epimorphism,

φ : F → M.

for a module M and free module F.

- If the kernel of φ is finitely generated, then M is called a finitely related module. Since M is isomorphic to F/ker(φ), this basically expresses that M is obtained by taking a free module and introducing finitely many relations within F (the generators of ker(φ)).
- If the kernel of φ is finitely generated and F has finite rank (i.e. F = R^{k}), then M is said to be a finitely presented module. Here, M is specified using finitely many generators (the images of the k generators of F = R^{k}) and finitely many relations (the generators of ker(φ)). See also: free presentation. Finitely presented modules can be characterized by an abstract property within the category of R-modules: they are precisely the compact objects in this category.
- A coherent module M is a finitely generated module whose finitely generated submodules are finitely presented.

Over any ring R, coherent modules are finitely presented, and finitely presented modules are both finitely generated and finitely related. For a Noetherian ring R, finitely generated, finitely presented, and coherent are equivalent conditions on a module.

Some crossover occurs for projective or flat modules. A finitely generated projective module is finitely presented, and a finitely related flat module is projective.

It is true also that the following conditions are equivalent for a ring R:

1. R is a right coherent ring.
2. The module R_{R} is a coherent module.
3. Every finitely presented right R module is coherent.

Although coherence seems like a more cumbersome condition than finitely generated or finitely presented, it is nicer than them since the category of coherent modules is an abelian category, while, in general, neither finitely generated nor finitely presented modules form an abelian category.

== See also ==
- Integral element
- Artin–Rees lemma
- Countably generated module
- Finite algebra
- Coherent sheaf, a generalization used in algebraic geometry

== Textbooks ==
- Atiyah, M. F.; Macdonald, I. G. (1969), Introduction to Commutative Algebra, Addison-Wesley Publishing Co., Reading, Mass.-London-Don Mills, Ont., pp. ix+128, MR 0242802
- Bourbaki, Nicolas (1998), Commutative algebra. Chapters 1--7 Translated from the French. Reprint of the 1989 English translation, Elements of Mathematics, Berlin: Springer-Verlag, ISBN 3-540-64239-0
- Kaplansky, Irving (1970), Commutative rings, Boston, Mass.: Allyn and Bacon Inc., pp. x+180, MR 0254021
- Lam, T. Y. (1999), Lectures on modules and rings, Graduate Texts in Mathematics No. 189, Springer-Verlag, ISBN 978-0-387-98428-5
- Lang, Serge (1997), Algebra (3rd ed.), Addison-Wesley, ISBN 978-0-201-55540-0
- Matsumura, Hideyuki (1989), Commutative ring theory, Cambridge Studies in Advanced Mathematics, vol. 8, Translated from the Japanese by M. Reid (2 ed.), Cambridge: Cambridge University Press, pp. xiv+320, ISBN 0-521-36764-6, MR 1011461
- Springer, Tonny A. (1977), Invariant theory, Lecture Notes in Mathematics, vol. 585, Springer, doi:10.1007/BFb0095644, ISBN 978-3-540-08242-2.
