= Glossary of commutative algebra =

This is a glossary of commutative algebra.

See also list of algebraic geometry topics, glossary of classical algebraic geometry, glossary of algebraic geometry, glossary of ring theory and glossary of module theory.

In this article, all rings are assumed to be commutative with identity 1.

== !$@ ==
()
1. k(x,y,...) is a field extension of k generated by x,y,...
2. (x,y,...) is the ideal generated by x,y,...
3. (I:J) is the ideal quotient of I by J, consisting of all elements x such that xJ⊆I.
[]
R[x,y,...] is a polynomial ring over R.
[[]]
R[[x,y,...]] is a formal power series ring over R.
{}
R{x,y,...} is a ring of formal power series over R satisfying some convergence condition.
^
Â is the completion of A.

== A ==
absolute integral closure
The absolute integral closure is the integral closure of an integral domain in an algebraic closure of the field of fractions of the domain.
absolutely
The word "absolutely" usually means "not relatively"; i.e., independent of the base field in some sense. It is often synonymous with "geometrically".
1. An absolutely flat ring is a ring such that all modules over it are flat. (Non-commutative rings with this property are called von Neumann regular rings.)
2. An ideal in a polynomial ring over a field is called absolutely prime if its extension remains prime for every extension of the field.
3. An ideal in a polynomial ring over a field is called absolutely unramified if it is unramified for every extension of the field.
4. Absolutely normal is an alternative term for geometrically normal.
5. Absolutely regular is an alternative term for geometrically regular.
6. An absolutely simple point is one with a geometrically regular local ring.
acceptable ring
Acceptable rings are generalizations of excellent rings, with the conditions about regular rings in the definition replaced by conditions about Gorenstein rings.
adic
The I-adic topology on a ring has a base of neighborhoods of 0 given by powers of the ideal I.
affine ring
An affine ring R over another ring S (often a field) is a ring (or sometimes an integral domain) that is finitely generated over S.
algebraic-geometrical local ring
A local ring that is a localization of a finitely-generated domain over a field.
almost
1. An element x of a ring is called almost integral over a subring if there is a regular element a of the subring so that ax^{n} is in the subring for all positive integers n.
2. An integral domain S is called almost finite over a subring R if its field of quotients is a finite extension of the field of quotients of S.
altitude
1. The altitude of a ring is an archaic name for its dimension.
2. The altitude of an ideal is another name for its height.
analytic
1. The analytic spread of an ideal of a local ring is the Krull dimension of the fiber at the special point of the local ring of the Rees algebra of the ideal.
2. The analytic deviation of an ideal is its analytic spread minus its height.
3. An analytic ring is a quotient of a ring of convergent power series in a finite number of variables over a field with a valuation.
analytically
This often refers to properties of the completion of a local ring; cf. formally
1. A local ring is called analytically normal if its completion is an integrally closed domain.
2. A local ring is called analytically unramified if its completion has no nonzero nilpotent elements.
3. A local ring is called analytically irreducible if its completion has no zero divisors.
4. Two local rings are called analytically isomorphic if their completions are isomorphic.
annihilator
The annihilator of a subset of a module is the ideal of elements whose product with any element of the subset is 0.
Artin
Artinian
1. Emil Artin
2. Michael Artin
3. An Artinian module is a module satisfying the descending chain condition on submodules.
4. An Artinian ring is a ring satisfying the descending chain condition on ideals.
5. The Artin-Rees lemma establishes a certain stability of filtration by an ideal.
ASL
Acronym for algebra with straightening law.
associated
An associated prime of a module M over a ring R is a prime ideal p such that M has a submodule isomorphic to R/p.

== B ==
Bass number
If M is a module over a local ring R with residue field k, then the ith Bass number of M is the k-dimension of Ext^{i}_{R}(k,M).
Bézout domain
A Bézout domain is an integral domain in which the sum of two principal ideals is a principal ideal.
big
The word "big" when applied to a module emphasizes that the module is not necessarily finitely generated. In particular a big Cohen–Macaulay module is a module that has a system of parameters for which it is regular.
Boolean ring
A Boolean ring is a ring such that x^{2}=x for all x.
Bourbaki ideal
A Bourbaki ideal of a torsion-free module M is an ideal isomorphic (as a module) to a torsion-free quotient of M by a free submodule.
Buchsbaum ring
A Buchsbaum ring is a Noetherian local ring such that every system of parameters is a weak sequence.

== C ==
canonical
"Canonical module" is an alternative term for a dualizing module.
catenary
A ring is called catenary if for every two prime ideals, one contained in the other, all maximal chains between them have the same length.
center
The center of a valuation (or place) is the ideal of elements of positive order.
chain
A strictly increasing or decreasing sequence of prime ideals.
characteristic
The characteristic of a ring is a non-negative integer generating the Z-ideal of multiples of 1 that are zero.
clean
1. A finitely generated module M over a Noetherian ring R is called clean if it has a finite filtration all of whose quotients are of the form R/p for p an associated prime of M. A stronger variation of this definition says that the primes p must be minimal primes of the support of M.
2. An element of a ring is called clean if it is the sum of a unit and an idempotent, and is called almost clean if it is the sum of a regular element and an idempotent. A ring is called clean or almost clean if all its elements are clean or almost clean, and a module is called clean or almost clean if its endomorphism ring is clean or almost clean.
CM
Abbreviation for Cohen–Macaulay or complex multiplication.
CoCoA
The CoCoA computer algebra system for computations in commutative algebra
codepth
The codepth of a finitely generated module over a Noetherian local ring is its dimension minus its depth.
codimension
The codimension of a prime ideal is another name for its height.
coefficient ring
1. A complete Noetherian local ring
2. A complete Noetherian local ring with finite residue field
3. An alternative name for a Cohen ring
Cohen
1. Irvin Cohen
2. A Cohen ring is a field or a complete discrete valuation ring of mixed characteristic (0,p) whose maximal ideal is generated by p.
Cohen–Macaulay
1. A local ring is called Cohen–Macaulay if it is Noetherian and the Krull dimension is equal to the depth. A ring is called Cohen–Macaulay if it is Noetherian and all localizations at maximal ideals are Cohen–Macaulay.
2. A generalized Cohen–Macaulay ring is a Noetherian local ring such that for i < the Krull dimension of the ring, the i-th local cohomology of the ring along the maximal ideal has finite length.
coherent
1. A module is called coherent if it is finitely generated and every homomorphism to it from a finitely generated module has a finitely generated kernel.
2. A coherent ring is a ring that is a coherent module over itself.
complete
1. A local complete intersection ring is a Noetherian local ring whose completion is the quotient of a regular local ring by an ideal generated by a regular sequence.
2. A complete local ring is a local ring that is complete in the topology (or rather uniformity) where the powers of the maximal ideal form a base of the neighborhoods of 0.
completely integrally closed
A domain R is called completely integrally closed if, whenever all positive powers of some element x of the quotient field are contained in a finitely generated R-module, x is in R.
completion
The completion of a module or ring M at an ideal I is the inverse limit of the modules M/I^{n}M.
composite
1. A composite number is a positive integer that is neither prime nor 1.
2. The composite of a valuation ring R and a valuation ring S of its residue field is the inverse image of S in R.
conductor
The conductor of an integral domain R is the annihilator of the R-module T/R, where T is the integral closure of R in its quotient field.
congruence ideal
A congruence ideal of a surjective homomorphism f: B→C of commutative rings is the image under f of the annihilator of the kernel of f.
connected
A graded algebra over a field k is connected if its 0th degree component is k.
conormal
The conormal module of a quotient of a ring by an ideal I is the module I/I^{2}.
constructible
For a Noetherian ring, a constructible subset of the spectrum is one that is a finite union of locally closed sets. For rings that are not Noetherian the definition of a constructible subset is more complicated.
content
The content of a polynomial is a greatest common divisor of its coefficients.
contraction
The contraction of an ideal is the ideal given by the inverse image of some ideal under a homomorphism of rings.
coprimary
A coprimary module is a module with exactly one associated prime.
coprime
1. Two ideals are called coprime if their sum is the whole ring.
2. Two elements of a ring are called coprime if the ideal they generate is the whole ring.
cotangent
The cotangent space of a local ring with maximal ideal m is the vector space m/m^{2} over the residue field.
Cox ring
A Cox ring is a sort of universal homogeneous coordinate ring for a projective variety.

== D ==
decomposable
A module is called decomposable if it can be written as a direct sum of two non-zero submodules.
decomposition group
A decomposition group is a group of automorphisms of a ring whose elements fix a given prime ideal.
Dedekind domain
A Dedekind domain is a Noetherian integrally closed domain of dimension at most 1.
defect
deficiency
The ramification defect or ramification deficiency d of a valuation of a field K is given by [L:K]=defg where e is the ramification index, f is the inertia degree, and g is the number of extensions of the valuation to a larger field L. The number d is a power p^{δ} of the characteristic p, and sometimes δ rather than d is called the ramification deficiency.
depth
The I-depth (also called grade) of a module M over a ring R, where I is an ideal, is the smallest integer n such that Ext^{n}_{R}(R/I,M) is nonzero. When I is the maximal ideal of a local ring this is just called the depth of M, and if in addition M is the local ring R this is called the depth of the ring R.
derivation
An additive homomorphism d from a ring to a module that satisfies Leibniz's rule d(ab)=ad(b)+bd(a).
derived
The derived normal ring of an integral domain is its integral closure in its quotient field.
determinant module
The determinant module of a module is the top exterior power of the module.
determinantal
This often refers to properties of an ideal generated by determinants of minors of a matrix. For example, a determinantal ring is generated by the entries of a matrix, with relations given by the determinants of the minors of some fixed size.
deviation
A deviation of a local ring is an invariant that measures how far the ring is from being regular.
dimension
1. The Krull dimension of a ring, often just called the dimension, is the maximal length of a chain of prime ideals, and the Krull dimension of a module is the maximal length of a chain of prime ideals containing its annihilator.
2. The weak dimension or flat dimension of a module is the shortest length of a flat resolution.
3. The injective dimension of a module is the shortest length of an injective resolution.
4. The projective dimension of a module is the shortest length of a projective resolution.
5. The dimension of a vector space over a field is the minimal number of generators; this is unrelated to most other definitions of its dimension as a module over a field.
6. The homological dimension of a module may refer to almost any of the various other dimensions, such as weak dimension, injective dimension, or projective dimension.
7. The global dimension of a ring is the supremum of the projective dimensions of its modules.
8. The weak global dimension of a ring is the supremum of the flat dimensions of its modules.
9. The embedding dimension of a local ring is the dimension of its Zariski tangent space.
10. The dimension of a valuation ring over a field is the transcendence degree of its residue field; this is not usually the same as the Krull dimension.
discrete valuation ring
A discrete valuation ring is an integrally closed Noetherian local ring of dimension 1.
divisible
A divisible module is a module such that multiplication by any regular element of the ring is surjective.
divisor
1. A divisor of an integral domain is an equivalence class of non-zero fractional ideals, where two such ideals are called equivalent if they are contained in the same principal fractional ideals.
2. A Weil divisor of a ring is an element of the free abelian group generated by the codimension 1 prime ideals.
3. Cartier divisor
divisorial ideal
A divisorial ideal of an integral domain is a non-zero fractional ideal that is an intersection of principal fractional ideals.
domain
A domain or integral domain is a ring with no zero-divisors and where 1≠0.
dominate
A local ring B is said to dominate a local ring A if it contains A and the maximal ideal of B contains the maximal ideal of A.
dual
duality
dualizing
1. Grothendieck local duality is a duality for cohomology of modules over a local ring.
2. Matlis duality is a duality between Artinian and Noetherian modules over a complete local ring.
3. Macaulay duality is a duality between Artinian and Noetherian modules over a complete local ring that is finitely generated over a field.
4. A dualizing module (also called a canonical module) for a Noetherian ring R is a finitely-generated module M such that for any maximal ideal m, the R/m vector space Ext^{n}_{R}(R/m,M) vanishes if n≠ height(m) and is 1-dimensional if n=height(m).
5. A dualizing complex is a complex generalizing many of the properties of a dualizing module to rings that do not have a dualizing module.
DVR
Abbreviation for discrete valuation ring.

== E ==
Eakin
The Eakin–Nagata theorem states: given a finite ring extension $A \subset B$, $A$ is a Noetherian ring if and only if $B$ is a Noetherian ring.
Eisenstein
Named after Gotthold Eisenstein
1. The ring of Eisenstein integers is the ring generated by a primitive cube root of 1.
2. An Eisenstein polynomial is a polynomial such that its leading term is 1, all other coefficients are divisible by a prime, and the constant term is not divisible by the square of the prime.
3. The Eisenstein criterion states that an Eisenstein polynomial is irreducible.
4. An Eisenstein extension is an extension generated by a root of an Eisenstein polynomial.
embedded
An embedded prime of a module is a non-minimal associated prime.
embedding dimension
See dimension.
envelope
An injective envelope (or hull) of a module is a minimal injective module containing it.
equicharacteristic
A local ring is called equicharacteristic if it has the same characteristic as its residue field.
essential
1. A submodule M of N is called an essential submodule if it intersects every nonzero submodule of N.
2. An essential extension of a module M is a module N containing M such that every non-zero submodule intersects M.
essentially of finite type
An algebra is said to be essentially of finite type over another algebra if it is a localization of a finitely generated algebra.
étale
1. A morphism of rings is called étale if it is formally etale and locally finitely presented.
2. An étale algebra over a field is a finite product of finite separable extensions.
Euclidean domain
A Euclidean domain is an integral domain with a form of Euclid's algorithm.
exact zero divisor
A zero divisor $x$ is said to be an exact zero divisor if its annihilator, $\operatorname{Ann}_R(x)=\{ r\in R\mid rx=0 \}$, is a principal ideal $yR$ whose annihilator is $xR$: $\operatorname{Ann}_R(x)=\{ r\in R\mid rx=0 \}= yR$ and $\operatorname{Ann}_R(y)=\{ r\in R\mid ry=0 \}= xR$.
excellent
An excellent ring is a universally catenary Grothendieck ring such that for every finitely generated algebra the singular points of the spectrum form a closed subset.
Ext
The Ext functors, the derived functors of the Hom functor.
extension
1. An extension of an ideal is the ideal generated by the image under a homomorphism of rings.
2. An extension of a module may mean either a module containing it as a submodule or a module mapping onto it as a quotient module.
3. An essential extension of a module M is a module containing M such that every non-zero submodule intersects M.

== F ==
face ring
An alternative name for a Stanley–Reisner ring.
factorial
Factorial ring is an alternative name for a unique factorization domain.
faithful
1. A faithful module is a module whose annihilator is 0.
faithfully
1. A faithfully flat module over a ring R is a flat module whose tensor product with any non-zero module is non-zero.
2. A faithfully flat algebra over a ring R is an algebra that is faithfully flat as a module.
field
1. A commutative ring such that every nonzero element has an inverse
2. The field of fractions, or fraction field, of an integral domain is the smallest field containing it.
3. A residue field is the quotient of a ring by a maximal ideal.
4. A quotient field may mean either a residue field of a field of fractions.
finite
A finite module (or algebra) over a ring usually means one that is finitely generated as a module. It may also mean one with a finite number of elements, especially in the term finite field.
finite type
An algebra over a ring is said to be of finite type if it is finitely generated as an algebra.
finitely generated
1. A module over a ring is called finitely generated if every element is a linear combination of a fixed finite number of elements. If the module happens to be an algebra this is much stronger than saying it is finitely generated as an algebra.
2. An algebra over a ring is called finitely generated if it is finitely generated as an algebra, which is much weaker than saying it is finitely generated as a module.
3. An extension of fields is called finitely generated if elements of the larger field can all be expressed as rational functions of a finite generating set.
Fitting ideal
The Fitting ideal I_{n}(M) of a module M generated by g elements is the ideal generated by the determinants of the minors of size g–n of the matrix of relations defining the module.
flat
1. A flat module is a module such that tensoring with it preserves exactness.
2. A flat resolution is a resolution by flat modules.
3. For flat dimension, see dimension.
4. A module M over a ring R is called normally flat along an ideal I if the R/I-module ⊕I^{n}M/I^{n+1}M is flat.
5. A flat cover of a module M is a map from a flat module to M with superfluous kernel.
formally
1. A homomorphism f:A→B of rings is called formally smooth, formally unramified, or formally etale if for every A-algebra R with a nilpotent ideal I, the natural map from Hom_{A}(R/I, B) to Hom_{A}(R, B) is surjective, injective, or bijective. The algebra B is then called a formally smooth, formally unramified, or formally etale A-algebra.
2. A Noetherian local ring is called formally equidimensional (or quasi-unmixed) if its completion is equidimensional.
3. Formally catenary rings are rings such that every quotient by a prime ideal is formally equidimensional. For Noetherian local rings this is equivalent to the ring being universally catenary.
fractional ideal
If K is the ring of fractions of an integral domain R, then a fractional ideal of R is a submodule of the R-module K contained in kR for some k in K.
fractionary ideal
An alternative name for fractional ideals

== G ==
G-ring
An alternative name for a Grothendieck ring.
Gaussian
The Gaussian ring is the ring of Gaussian integers m+ni.
GCD
1. Abbreviation for greatest common divisor
2. A GCD domain is an integral domain such that any two elements have a greatest common divisor (GCD).
geometrically
The word "geometrically" usually refers to properties that continue to hold after taking finite field extensions. For example, a ring R over a field k is called geometrically normal, geometrically regular, or geometrically reduced if R⊗_{k}K is normal, regular, or reduced for every finite extension field K of k.
going down
1. An extension R⊆S of commutative rings is said to have the going down property if whenever p_{1}⊆p_{2} is a chain of prime ideals in R and q_{2} is a prime ideal of S with q_{2}∩R=p_{2}, there is a prime ideal q_{1} of S with q_{1}⊆q_{2} and q_{1}∩R=p_{1}.
2. The going down theorem states that an integral extension R⊆S such that S is a domain and R is integrally closed has the going down property.
going up
1. An extension R⊆S of commutative rings is said to have the going up property if whenever p_{1}⊆p_{2} is a chain of prime ideals in R and q_{1} is a prime ideal of S with q_{1}∩R=p_{1}, there is a prime ideal q_{2} of S with q_{1}⊆q_{2} and q_{2}∩R=p_{2}.
2. The going up theorem states that an integral extension R⊆S has the going up property.
Gorenstein
1. Daniel Gorenstein
2. A Gorenstein local ring is a Noetherian local ring that has finite injective dimension as a module over itself.
3. A Gorenstein ring is a ring all of whose localizations at prime ideals are Gorenstein local rings.
grade
The various uses of the term "grade" are sometimes inconsistent and incompatible with each other.
1. The grade grade(I,M) of an ideal I on a finitely-generated module M over a Noetherian ring is the length of a maximal M-regular sequence in I. This is also called the depth of I on M
2. The grade grade(M) of a module M over a ring R is grade(Ann M,R), which for a finitely generated module over a Noetherian ring is the smallest n such that Ext^{n}_{R}(M,R) is non-zero.
3. The grade of a module M over a Noetherian local ring with maximal ideal I is the grade of m on I. This is also called the depth of M. This is not consistent with the other definition of the grade of a module given above.
4. The grade grade(I) of an ideal is given the grade grade(R/I) of the module R/I. So the grade of the ideal I is usually not the same as the grade of the module I.
graded
A graded algebra or module is one that is a direct sum of pieces indexed by an abelian group, often the group of integers.
Gröbner basis
A Gröbner basis is a set of generators for an ideal of a polynomial ring satisfying certain conditions.
Grothendieck
Named after Alexander Grothendieck
1. A Grothendieck ring is a Noetherian ring whose formal fibers are geometrically regular.
2. Grothendieck local duality is a duality theorem for modules over local rings.

== H ==
HCF
Abbreviation for highest common factor
height
1. The height of a prime ideal, also called its codimension or rank or altitude, is the supremum of the lengths of chains of prime ideals descending from it.
2. The height of a valuation or place is the height of its valuation group, which is the number of proper convex subgroups of its valuation group.
Hensel
Henselian
Henselization
Named after Kurt Hensel
1. Hensel's lemma states that if R is a complete local ring with maximal ideal m and P is a monic polynomial in R[x], then any factorization of its image P in (R/m)[x] into a product of coprime monic polynomials can be lifted to a factorization in R[x].
2. A Henselian ring is a local ring in which Hensel's lemma holds.
3. The Henselization of a local ring is a Henselian ring constructed from it.
Hilbert
Named after David Hilbert
1. Hilbert ring is an alternative term for a Jacobson ring.
2. A Hilbert polynomial measures the rate of growth of a module over a graded ring or local ring.
3. Hilbert's Nullstellensatz identifies irreducible subsets of affine space with radical ideals of the coordinate ring.
4. Hilbert's syzygy theorem gives a finite free resolution of modules over a polynomial ring.
5. The Hilbert basis theorem states that the ring of polynomials over a field is Noetherian, or more generally that any finitely generated algebra over a Noetherian ring is Noetherian.
6. The Hilbert–Burch theorem describes a free resolution of a quotient of a local ring with projective dimension 2.
7. The Hilbert–Kunz function measures the severity of singularities in a positive characteristic.
Hironaka
Named after Heisuke Hironaka
1. A Hironaka decomposition is a representation of a ring as a finite free module over a polynomial ring or regular local ring.
2. Hironaka's criterion states that a ring that is a finite module over a regular local ring or polynomial algebra is Cohen–Macaulay if and only if it is a free module
.
Hodge
Named after W. V. D. Hodge
A Hodge algebra is an algebra with a special basis similar to a basis of standard monomials.
hull
An injective hull (or envelope) of a module is a minimal injective module containing it.

== I ==
ideal
A submodule of a ring. Special cases include:
1. An ideal of definition of a module M over a local ring R with maximal ideal m is a proper ideal I such that m^{n}M is contained in IM for some n.
idealwise separated
A module $M$ is idealwise separated for an ideal I if for every ideal, $\mathfrak{a}$, $\bigcap_{n \ge 1} I^n(\mathfrak{a} \otimes M) = 0$ (for example, this is the case when A is a Noetherian local ring, I its maximal ideal and M finitely generated).
idempotent
An element x with x^{2}=x.
incomparability property
The extension A⊆B is said to satisfy the incomparability property if whenever Q and Q' are distinct primes of B lying over prime P in A, then Q⊈Q' and Q'⊈Q.
indecomposable
A module is called indecomposable if it is not the direct sum of two proper submodules.
inertia group
An inertia group is a group of automorphisms of a ring whose elements fix a given prime ideal and act trivially on the corresponding residue class ring.
infinitely generated
Not finitely generated.
initial ideal
1. In a graded ring, the initial ideal of an ideal I is the set of all homogeneous components of minimal degree of the elements in I (this is an ideal of the multiplicative monoid of the homogeneous elements.)
2. In the context of Gröbner bases, the initial ideal of an ideal I for a given monomial ordering is the set of all leading monomials of the elements in I (this is an ideal of the multiplicative monoid of the monomials).
injective
1. An injective module is one with the property that maps from submodules to it can be extended to larger modules.
2. An injective envelope or injective hull of a module is a smallest injective module containing it.
3. An injective resolution is a resolution by injective modules.
4. The injective dimension of a module is the smallest length of an injective resolution.
integral
The two different meanings of integral (no zero divisors, or every element being a root of a monic polynomial) are sometimes confused.
1. An integral domain or integral ring is a nontrivial ring without zero-divisors.
2. An element is called integral over a subring if it is a root of a monic polynomial with coefficients in the subring.
3. An element x of a ring is called almost integral over a subring if there is a regular element a of the subring so that ax^{n} is in the subring for all positive integers n.
4. The integral closure of a subring of a ring is the ring of all elements that are integral over it.
5. An algebra over a ring is called an integral algebra if all its elements are integral over the ring.
6. A ring is called locally integral if it is reduced and the localization at every prime ideal is integral.
7. A domain is called integrally closed if it is its own integral closure in the field of fractions.
invertible
An invertible fractional ideal is a fractional ideal that has an inverse in the monoid of fractional ideals under multiplication.
irreducible
1. An element of a ring is called irreducible if it cannot be written as a product of two non-units.
2. An irreducible ring is a ring where the zero ideal is not an intersection of two non-zero ideals, and more generally an irreducible module is a module where the zero module cannot be written as an intersection of non-zero submodules.
3. An ideal or submodule is called irreducible if it cannot be written as an intersection of two larger ideals or submodules. If the ideal or submodule is the whole ring or module this is inconsistent with the definition of an irreducible ring or module.
irrelevant
The irrelevant ideal of a graded algebra is generated by all elements of positive degree.
isolated
An isolated prime of a module is a minimal associated prime.

== J ==
J-0 ring
A J-0 ring is a ring such that the set of regular points of the spectrum contains a non-empty open subset.
J-1 ring
A J-1 ring is a ring such that the set of regular points of the spectrum is an open subset.
J-2 ring
A J-2 ring is a ring such that any finitely generated algebra is a J-1 ring.
Jacobian
1. The Jacobian matrix is a matrix whose entries are the partial derivatives of some polynomials.
2. The Jacobian ideal of a quotient of a polynomial ring by an ideal of pure codimension n is the ideal generated by the size n minors of the Jacobian matrix.
3. The Jacobian criterion is a criterion stating that a local ring is geometrically regular if and only if the rank of a corresponding Jacobian matrix is the maximum possible.
Jacobson
Named after Nathan Jacobson
1. The Jacobson radical of a ring is the intersection of its maximal ideals.
2. A Jacobson ring is a ring such that every prime ideal is an intersection of maximal ideals.
Japanese ring
A Japanese ring (also called N-2 ring) is an integral domain R such that for every finite extension L of its quotient field K, the integral closure of R in L is a finitely generated R module.

== K ==
Kähler differential
The module of Kähler differentials of a ring is the universal module with a derivation from the ring to it.
Kleinian integer
The Kleinian integers are the integers of the imaginary quadratic field of discriminant −7.
Koszul complex
The Koszul complex is a free resolution constructed from a regular sequence.
Krull ring
A Krull ring (or Krull domain) is a ring with a well behaved theory of prime factorization.
Krull dimension
See dimension.

== L ==
Laskerian ring
A Laskerian ring is a ring in which any ideal has a primary decomposition.
length
The length of a module is the length of any composition series.
linearly disjoint
Two subfields of a field extension K over a field k are called linearly disjoint if the natural map from their tensor product over k to the subfield of K they generate is an isomorphism.
linked
linkage
A relation between ideals in a Gorenstein ring.
local
localization
locally
1. A local ring is a ring with just one maximal ideal. In older books it is sometimes also assumed to be Noetherian.
2. The local cohomology of a module M is given by the derived functors of direct-lim_{k} Hom_{R}(R/I^{k},M).
3. The localization of a ring at a (multiplicative) subset is the ring formed by forcing all elements of the mutliplicative subset to be invertible.
4. The localization of a ring at a prime ideal is the localization of the multiplicative subset given by the complement of the prime ideal.
5. A ring is called locally integral if it is reduced and the localization at every prime ideal is integral.
6. A ring has some property locally if its spectrum is covered by spectra of localizations R[1/a] having the property.
lying over property
An extension of rings has the lying over property if the corresponding map between their prime spectra is surjective.

== M ==
Macaulay
Named after Francis Sowerby Macaulay
1. A Macaulay ring is an alternative name for a Cohen–Macaulay ring.
2. The Macaulay computer algebra system.
3. Macaulay duality is a special case of Matlis duality for local rings that are finitely generated algebras over a field.
Matlis
Named after Eben Matlis
1. Matlis duality is a duality between Artinian and Noetherian modules over a complete Noetherian local ring.
2. A Matlis module is an injective envelope of the residue field of a local ring.
maximal
1. A maximal ideal is a maximal element of the set of proper ideals of a ring.
2. A maximal Cohen–Macaulay module over a Noetherian local ring R is a Cohen–Macaulay module whose dimension is the same as that of R.
minimal
1. A minimal prime of an ideal is a minimal element of the set of prime ideals containing it.
2. A minimal resolution of a module is a resolution contained in any other resolution.
3. A minimal primary decomposition is a primary decomposition with the smallest possible number of terms.
4. A minimal prime of a domain is a minimal element of the set of nonzero prime ideals.
miracle
1. Miracle flatness is another name for Hironaka's criterion, which says that a local ring that is finite over a regular local ring is Cohen-Macaulay if and only if it is a flat module.
Mittag-Leffler condition
The Mittag-Leffler condition is a condition on an inverse system of modules that ensures the vanishing of the first derived functor of the inverse limit.
modular system
An archaic term for an ideal
monomial
A product of powers of generators of an algebra
Mori domain
A Mori domain is an integral domain satisfying the ascending chain conditions on integral divisorial ideals.
multiplicative subset
A subset of a ring closed under multiplication
multiplicity
The multiplicity of a module M at a prime ideal p or a ring R is the number of times R/p occurs in M, or more precisely the length of the localization M_{p} as a module over R_{p}.

== N ==
N-1
An N-1 ring is an integral domain whose integral closure in its quotient field is a finitely generated module.
N-2
An N-2 ring is the same as a Japanese ring, in other words an integral domain whose integral closure in any finite extension of its quotient field is a finitely generated module.
Nagata ring
A Nagata ring is a Noetherian universally Japanese ring. These are also called pseudo-geometric rings.
Nakayama's lemma
Nakayama's lemma states that if a finitely generated module M is equal to IM where I is the Jacobson radical, then M is zero.
neat
Occasionally used to mean "unramified".
nilpotent
Some power is zero. Can be applied to elements of a ring or ideals of a ring. See nilpotent.
nilradical
The nilradical of a ring is the ideal of nilpotent elements.
Noether
Noetherian
Named after Emmy Noether
1. A Noetherian module is a module such that every submodule is finitely generated.
2. A Noetherian ring is a ring that is a Noetherian module over itself, in other words every ideal is finitely generated.
3. Noether normalization represents a finitely generated algebra over a field as a finite module over a polynomial ring.
normal
A normal domain is an integral domain that is integrally closed in its quotient field.
A normal ring is a ring whose localizations at prime ideals are normal domains.
normally flat
A module M over a ring R is called normally flat along an ideal I if the R/I-module ⊕I^{n}M/I^{n+1}M is flat.
Nullstellensatz
German for "zero locus theorem".
Over algebraically closed field, the weak Nullstellensatz states that the points of affine space correspond to maximal ideals of its coordinate ring, and the strong Nullstellensatz states that closed subsets of a variety correspond to radical ideals of its coordinate ring.

== O ==
orientation
An orientation of a module over a ring R is an isomorphism from the highest non-zero exterior power of the module to R.

== P ==
parafactorial
A Noetherian local ring R is called parafactorial if it has depth at least 2 and the Picard group Pic(Spec(R) − m) of its spectrum with the closed point m removed is trivial.
parameter
See system of parameters.
perfect
In non-commutative ring theory, perfect ring has an unrelated meaning.
1. A module is called perfect if its projective dimension is equal to its grade.
2. An ideal I of a ring R is called perfect if R/I is a perfect module.
3. A field is called perfect if all finite extension fields are separable.
Pic
Picard group
The Picard group Pic(R) of a ring R is the group of isomorphism classes of finite projective modules of rank 1.
PID
Abbreviation for principal ideal domain.
place
A place of a field K with values in a field L is a map from K∪∞ to L∪∞ preserving addition and multiplication and 1.
presentable
A presentable ring is one that is a quotient of a regular ring.
prime
1. A prime ideal is a proper ideal whose complement is closed under multiplication.
2. A prime element of a ring is an element that generates a prime ideal.
3. A prime local ring is a localization of the integers at a prime ideal.
4. "Prime sequence" is an alternative name for a regular sequence.
primary
1. A primary ideal is a proper ideal p of a ring R such that if rm is in p then either m is in p or some power of r is in p. More generally a primary submodule of a module M is a submodule N of M such that if rm is in N then either m is in N or some power of r annihilates N.
2. A primary decomposition of an ideal or submodule is an expression of it as a finite intersection of primary ideals or submodules.
principal
1. A principal ideal is an ideal generated by one element.
2. A principal ideal ring is a ring such that every ideal is principal.
3. A principal ideal domain is an integral domain such that every ideal is principal.
projective
1. A projective module is a module such that every epimorphism to it splits.
2. A projective resolution is a resolution by projective modules.
3. The projective dimension of a module is the smallest length of a projective resolution.
Prüfer domain
A Prüfer domain is a semiherediary integral domain.
pseudo
1. A finitely generated module M is called pseudo-zero if $M_{\mathfrak{p}} = 0$ for all prime ideals $\mathfrak{p}$ of height $\le 1$.
2. A morphism of modules is pseudo-injective if the kernel is pseudo-zero.
3. A morphism of modules is pseudo-surjective if the cokernel is pseudo-zero.
"Pseudogeometric ring" is an alternative name for a Nagata ring.
pure
1. A pure submodule M of a module N is a submodule such that M⊗A is a submodule of N⊗A for all modules A.
2. A pure subring R of a ring R is a subring such that M=M⊗S is a submodule of M⊗_{S}R for all S-modules M.
3. A pure module M over a ring R is a module such that dim(M) = dim(R/p) for every associated prime p of M.
purely
1. An element x is purely inseparable over a field if either the field has characteristic zero and x is in the field or the field has characteristic p and $x^{p^r}$ is in the field for some r.
2. A field extension is purely inseparable if it consists of purely inseparable elements.

== Q ==
quasi
1. A quasi-excellent ring is a Grothendieck ring such that for every finitely generated algebra the singular points of the spectrum form a closed subset.
2. A quasi-isomorphism is a morphism between complexes inducing an isomorphism on homology.
3. Quasi-local ring was an old term for a (possibly non-Noetherian) local ring in books that assumed local rings to be Noetherian.
4. quasi-unmixed; see formally equidimensional.
quotient
1. A quotient of a ring by an ideal, or of a module by a submodule.
2. A quotient field (or the field of fractions) of an integral domain is the localization at the prime ideal zero. This is sometimes confused with the first meaning.

== R ==
R_{n}
The condition R_{n} on a ring (for a non-negative integer n), "regular in codimension n", says that localization at any prime ideal of height at most n is regular. (cf. Serre's criterion on normality)
radical
1. The Jacobson radical of a ring.
2. The nilradical of a ring.
3. A radical of an element x of a ring is an element such that some positive power is x.
4. The radical of an ideal is the ideal of radicals of its elements.
5. The radical of a submodule M of a module N is the ideal of elements x such that some power of x maps N into M.
6. A radical extension of a ring is an extension generated by radicals of elements.
ramification group
A ramification group is a group of automorphisms of a ring R fixing some given prime ideal p and acting trivially on R/p^{n} for some integer n>1. (When n=1 it is called the inertia group.)
rank
1. Another older name for the height of a prime ideal.
2. The rank or height of a valuation is the Krull dimension of the corresponding valuation ring.
3. The rational or real rank of a valuation or place is the rational or real rank of its valuation group, which is the dimension of the corresponding rational or real vector space constructed by tensoring the valuation group with the rational or real numbers.
3. The minimum number of generators of a free module.
4. The rank of a module M over an integral domain R is the dimension of the vector space M⊗K over the quotient field K of R.
reduced
1. A reduced ring is one with no non-zero nilpotent elements.
2. Over a ring of characteristic p>0, a polynomial in several variables is called reduced if it has degree less than p in each variable.
reducible
See irreducible.
reduction
A reduction ideal of an ideal I with respect to a module M is an ideal J with JI^{n}M=I^{n+1}M for some positive integer n.
Rees
Named after David Rees
1. The Rees algebra of an ideal I is $\oplus_{n=0}^{\infty} t^nI^n=R[It]\subset R[t].$
2. A Rees decomposition of an algebra is a way of writing in it in terms of polynomial subalgebras.
reflexive
A module M is reflexive if the canonical map $M \to M^{**}, m \mapsto \langle \cdot, m \rangle$ is an isomorphism.
regular
1. A regular local ring is a Noetherian local ring whose dimension is equal to the dimension of its tangent space.
2. A regular ring is a ring whose localizations at all prime ideals are regular.
3. A regular element of a ring is an element that is not a zero divisor.
4. An M-regular element of a ring for some module M is an element of R that does not annihilate any non-zero element of M.
5. A regular sequence with respect to some module M is a sequence of elements a_{1},a_{2},...,a_{n} of R such that each a_{m+1} is regular for the module M/(a_{1},a_{2},...,a_{m})M.
6. In non-commutative ring theory, a von Neumann regular ring is a ring such that for every element x there is an element y with xyx=x. This is unrelated to the notion of a regular ring in commutative ring theory. In commutative algebra, commutative rings with this property are called absolutely flat.
regularity
Castelnuovo–Mumford regularity is an invariant of a graded module over a graded ring related to the vanishing of various cohomology groups.
residue field
The quotient of a ring, especially a local ring, by a maximal ideal.
resolution
A resolution of a module is a chain complex whose only non-zero homology group is the module.

== S ==
S_{n}
The condition S_{n} on a ring (for a non-negative integer n) says that the depth of the localization at any prime ideal is the height of the prime ideal whenever the depth is less than n. (cf. Serre's criterion on normality)
saturated
A subset X of a ring or module is called saturated with respect to a multiplicative subset S if xs in X and s in S implies that x is in X.
saturation
The saturation of a subset of a ring or module is the smallest saturated subset containing it.
semilocal
semi-local
1. A semilocal ring is a ring with only a finite number of maximal ideals.
2. "Semi-local ring" is an archaic term for a Zariski ring.
seminormal
A seminormal ring is a commutative reduced ring in which, whenever x, y satisfy $x^3 = y^2$, there is s with $s^2 = x$ and $s^3 = y$.
separable
An algebra over a field is called separable if its extension by any finite purely inseparable extension is reduced.
separated
An alternative term for Hausdorff, usually applied to a topology on a ring or module.
simple
A simple field is an archaic term for an algebraic number field whose ring of integers is a unique factorization domain.
singular
1. Not regular
2. Special in some way
3. The singular computer algebra system for commutative algebra
smooth
A smooth morphism of rings is a homomorphism that is formally smooth and finitely presented. These are analogous to submersions in differential topology. An algebra over a ring is called smooth if the corresponding morphism is smooth.
socle
The socle of a module is the sum of its simple submodules.
spectrum
1. The prime spectrum of a ring, often just called the spectrum, is a locally ringed space whose underlying topological space is the set of prime ideals with the Zariski topology.
2. The maximal spectrum of a ring is the set of maximal ideals with the Zariski topology.
stable
A decreasing filtration of a module is called stable (with respect to an ideal I) if M_{n+1}=IM_{n} for all sufficiently large n.
stably free
A module M over a ring R is called stably free if M⊕R^{n} is free for some natural number n.
Stanley
Named after Richard P. Stanley
1. A Stanley–Reisner ring is a quotient of a polynomial algebra by a square-free monomial ideal.
2. A Stanley decomposition is a way of writing a ring in terms of polynomial subrings.
strictly local
A ring is called strictly local if it is a local Henselian ring whose residue field is separably closed.
superfluous
A submodule M of N is called superfluous if M+X=N implies X=N (for submodules X).
superheight
The superheight of an ideal is the supremum of the nonzero codimensions of the proper extensions of the ideal under ring homomorphisms.
support
The support of a module M is the set of prime ideals p such that the localization of M at p is non-zero.
symbolic power
The symbolic power p^{(n)} of a prime ideal p is the set of elements x such that xy is in p^{n} for some y not in p. It is the smallest p-primary ideal containing p^{n}.
system of parameters
A set of dim R (if finite) elements of a local ring R with maximal ideal m that generates an m-primary ideal. It is a regular system of parameters if it actually generates m.
syzygy
An element of the kernel of one of the maps in a free resolution of a module.

== T ==
tangent
The Zariski tangent space of a local ring is the dual of its cotangent space.
tight closure
The tight closure I* of an ideal I of a ring with positive characteristic p>0 consists of the elements z such that there is some c not in any minimal prime ideal such that cz^{q} is in I^{[q]} for all sufficiently large powers q of p, where I^{[q]} is the ideal generated by all qth powers of elements of I.
Tor
The Torsion functors, the derived functors of the tensor product.
torsion
1. A torsion element of a module over a ring is an element annihilated by some regular element of the ring.
2. The torsion submodule of a module is the submodule of torsion elements.
3. A torsion-free module is a module with no torsion elements other than zero.
4. A torsion module is one all of whose elements are torsion elements.
5. The torsion functors Tor are the derived functors of the tensor product.
6. A torsionless module is a module isomorphic to a submodule of a free module.
total
The total ring of fractions or total quotient ring of a ring is formed by forcing all non zero divisors to have inverses.
trivial
A trivial ring is a ring with only one element.
type
The type of a finitely generated module M of depth d over a Noetherian local ring R with residue field k is the dimension (over k) of Ext^{d}_{R}(k,M).

== U ==
UFD
Abbreviation for unique factorization domain.
unibranch
A reduced local ring is called unibranch if it is integral and its integral closure is a local ring. A local ring is called unibranch if the corresponding reduced local ring is unibranch.
unimodular row
A sequence of elements $v_1, \dots, v_n$ in a ring that generate the unit ideal.
unique factorization domain
Also called a factorial domain. A unique factorization domain is an integral domain such that every element can be written as a product of primes in a way that is unique up to order and multiplication by units.
universally
A property is said to hold universally if it holds for various base changes. For example a ring is universally catenary if all finitely generated algebras over it are catenary.
universal
A universal field is an algebraically closed field with the uncountable transcendence degree over its prime field.
unmixed
An ideal I of a ring R is called unmixed if all associated primes of R/I have the same height.
unramified
1. An unramified morphism of rings is a homomorphism that is formally unramified and finitely presented. These are analogous to immersions in differential topology. An algebra over a ring is called unramified if the corresponding morphism is unramified.
2. An ideal in a polynomial ring over a field is called unramified for some extension of the field if the corresponding extension of the ideal is an intersection of prime ideals.

== V ==
valuation
1. A valuation is a homomorphism from the non-zero elements of a field to a totally ordered abelian group, with properties similar to the p-adic valuation of the rational numbers.
2. A valuation ring is an integral domain R such that if x is in its quotient field and if it is nonzero then either x or its inverse is in R.
3. A valuation group is a totally ordered abelian group. The valuation group of a valuation ring is the group of non-zero elements of the quotient field modulo the group of units of the valuation ring.

== W ==
weak
1. Weak dimension is an alternative name for flat dimension of a module.
2. A sequence $(a_1,\cdots,a_r)$ of elements of a maximal ideal $m$ is called a weak sequence if $m\cdot((a_1,\cdots,a_{i-1})\colon a_i)\subset(a_1,\cdots,a_{i-1})$ for all $i$.
Weierstrass ring
A Weierstrass ring is local ring that is Henselian, pseudo-geometric, and such that any quotient ring by a prime ideal is a finite extension of a regular local ring.

== XYZ ==
Zariski
Named after Oscar Zariski
1. A Zariski ring is a complete Noetherian topological ring with a basis of neighborhoods of 0 given by the powers of an ideal in the Jacobson radical (formerly called a semi-local ring).
2. The Zariski topology is the topology on the spectrum of a ring whose closed sets are the sets of prime ideals containing a given ideal.
3. Zariski's lemma says that if a field is a finitely generated algebra over another field then it is a finite dimensional vector space over the field.
4. Zariski's main lemma on holomorphic functions says the n-th symbolic power of a prime ideal in a polynomial ring is the intersection of the n-th powers of the maximal ideals containing the prime ideal.
5. The Zariski tangent space of a local ring with maximal ideal m is the dual of the vector space m/m^{2}.
zero divisor
A zero divisor in a ring is an element whose product with some nonzero element is 0.

== See also ==
- Glossary of ring theory

== General references ==
- Bourbaki, Nicolas (1998), Commutative algebra. Chapters 1–7, Elements of Mathematics (Berlin), Berlin, New York: Springer-Verlag, ISBN 978-3-540-64239-8
- Bruns, Winfried; Herzog, Jürgen (1993), Cohen-Macaulay rings, Cambridge Studies in Advanced Mathematics, vol. 39, Cambridge University Press, ISBN 978-0-521-41068-7, MR 1251956
- Eisenbud, David (1995), Commutative algebra, Graduate Texts in Mathematics, vol. 150, Berlin, New York: Springer-Verlag, doi:10.1007/978-1-4612-5350-1, ISBN 978-0-387-94268-1, MR 1322960
- Grothendieck, Alexandre; Dieudonné, Jean (1960). "Éléments de géométrie algébrique: I. Le langage des schémas". Publications Mathématiques de l'IHÉS. 4. doi:10.1007/bf02684778. MR 0217083.
- Grothendieck, Alexandre; Dieudonné, Jean (1961). "Éléments de géométrie algébrique: II. Étude globale élémentaire de quelques classes de morphismes". Publications Mathématiques de l'IHÉS. 8. doi:10.1007/bf02699291. MR 0217084.
- Grothendieck, Alexandre; Dieudonné, Jean (1961). "Eléments de géométrie algébrique: III. Étude cohomologique des faisceaux cohérents, Première partie". Publications Mathématiques de l'IHÉS. 11. doi:10.1007/bf02684274. MR 0217085.
- Grothendieck, Alexandre; Dieudonné, Jean (1963). "Éléments de géométrie algébrique: III. Étude cohomologique des faisceaux cohérents, Seconde partie". Publications Mathématiques de l'IHÉS. 17. doi:10.1007/bf02684890. MR 0163911.
- Grothendieck, Alexandre; Dieudonné, Jean (1964). "Éléments de géométrie algébrique: IV. Étude locale des schémas et des morphismes de schémas, Première partie". Publications Mathématiques de l'IHÉS. 20. doi:10.1007/bf02684747. MR 0173675.
- Grothendieck, Alexandre; Dieudonné, Jean (1965). "Éléments de géométrie algébrique: IV. Étude locale des schémas et des morphismes de schémas, Seconde partie". Publications Mathématiques de l'IHÉS. 24. doi:10.1007/bf02684322. MR 0199181.
- Grothendieck, Alexandre; Dieudonné, Jean (1966). "Éléments de géométrie algébrique: IV. Étude locale des schémas et des morphismes de schémas, Troisième partie". Publications Mathématiques de l'IHÉS. 28. doi:10.1007/bf02684343. MR 0217086.
- Grothendieck, Alexandre; Dieudonné, Jean (1967). "Éléments de géométrie algébrique: IV. Étude locale des schémas et des morphismes de schémas, Quatrième partie". Publications Mathématiques de l'IHÉS. 32. doi:10.1007/bf02732123. MR 0238860.
- Nagata, Masayoshi (1962), Local rings, Interscience Tracts in Pure and Applied Mathematics, vol. 13, New York-London: Interscience Publishers, ISBN 978-0470628652
