= Excellent ring =

Concept in commutative algebra

In commutative algebra, a quasi-excellent ring is a Noetherian commutative ring that behaves well with respect to the operation of completion, and is called an excellent ring if it is also universally catenary. Excellent rings are one answer to the problem of finding a natural class of "well-behaved" rings containing most of the rings that occur in number theory and algebraic geometry. At one time it seemed that the class of Noetherian rings might be an answer to this problem, but Masayoshi Nagata and others found several strange counterexamples showing that in general Noetherian rings need not be well-behaved: for example, a normal Noetherian local ring need not be analytically normal.

The class of excellent rings was defined by Alexander Grothendieck (1965) as a candidate for such a class of well-behaved rings. Quasi-excellent rings are conjectured to be the base rings for which the problem of resolution of singularities can be solved; Hironaka (1964) showed this in characteristic 0, but the positive characteristic case is (as of 2024) still a major open problem. Essentially all Noetherian rings that occur naturally in algebraic geometry or number theory are excellent; in fact it is quite hard to construct examples of Noetherian rings that are not excellent.

== Definitions ==
The definition of excellent rings is quite involved, so we recall the definitions of the technical conditions it satisfies. Although it seems like a long list of conditions, most rings in practice are excellent, such as fields, polynomial rings, complete Noetherian rings, Dedekind domains over characteristic 0 (such as $\mathbb{Z}$), and quotient and localization rings of these rings.

=== Recalled definitions ===
- A ring $R$ containing a field $k$ is called geometrically regular over $k$ if for any finite extension $K$ of $k$ the ring $R\otimes_kK$ is regular.
- A homomorphism of rings from $R \to S$ is called regular if it is flat and for every $\mathfrak{p} \in \text{Spec}(R)$ the fiber $S\otimes_R\kappa(\mathfrak{p})$ is geometrically regular over the residue field $\kappa(\mathfrak{p})$ of $\mathfrak{p}$.
- A ring $R$ is called a G-ring (or Grothendieck ring) if it is Noetherian and its formal fibers are geometrically regular; this means that for any $\mathfrak{p} \in \text{Spec}(R)$, the map from the local ring $R_\mathfrak{p} \to \hat{R_\mathfrak{p}}$ to its completion is regular in the sense above.
- Finally, a ring $R$ is J-2 if any finite type $R$-algebra $S$ is J-1, meaning the regular subscheme $\text{Reg}(\text{Spec}(S)) \subset \text{Spec}(S)$ is open.

=== Definition of (quasi-)excellence ===
A ring $R$ is called quasi-excellent if it is a G-ring and J-2 ring. It is called excellent^{pg 214} if it is quasi-excellent and universally catenary.

A scheme is called excellent or quasi-excellent if it has a cover by open affine subschemes with the same property, which implies that every open affine subscheme has this property.

== Properties ==
Because an excellent ring $R$ is a G-ring, it is Noetherian by definition. Because it is universally catenary, every maximal chain of prime ideals has the same length. This is useful for studying the dimension theory of such rings because their dimension can be bounded by a fixed maximal chain. In practice, this means infinite-dimensional Noetherian rings which have an inductive definition of maximal chains of prime ideals, giving an infinite-dimensional ring, cannot be constructed.

=== Schemes ===
Given an excellent scheme $X$ and a locally finite type morphism $f:X'\to X$, then $X'$ is excellent^{pg 217}.

=== Quasi-excellence ===
Any quasi-excellent ring is a Nagata ring.

Any quasi-excellent reduced local ring is analytically reduced.

Any quasi-excellent normal local ring is analytically normal.

== Examples ==
=== Excellent rings ===
Most naturally occurring commutative rings in number theory or algebraic geometry are excellent. In particular:

- All complete Noetherian local rings, for instance all fields and the ring Z_{p} of p-adic integers, are excellent.
- All Dedekind domains of characteristic 0 are excellent. In particular the ring Z of integers is excellent. Dedekind domains over fields of characteristic greater than 0 need not be excellent.
- The rings of convergent power series in a finite number of variables over R or C are excellent.
- Any localization of an excellent ring is excellent.
- Any finitely generated algebra over an excellent ring is excellent. This includes all polynomial algebras $R[x_1,\ldots, x_n]/(f_1,\ldots,f_k)$ with $R$ excellent. This means most rings considered in algebraic geometry are excellent.

=== A J-2 ring that is not a G-ring ===
Here is an example of a discrete valuation ring A of dimension 1 and characteristic p > 0 which is J-2 but not a G-ring and so is not quasi-excellent. If k is any field of characteristic p with [k : k^{p}] = ∞ and A is the ring of power series Σa_{i}x^{i} such that [k^{p}(a_{0}, a_{1}, ...) : k^{p}] is finite then the formal fibers of A are not all geometrically regular so A is not a G-ring. It is a J-2 ring as all Noetherian local rings of dimension at most 1 are J-2 rings. It is also universally catenary as it is a Dedekind domain. Here k^{p} denotes the image of k under the Frobenius morphism a → a^{p}.

=== A G-ring that is not a J-2 ring ===
Here is an example of a ring that is a G-ring but not a J-2 ring and so not quasi-excellent. If R is the subring of the polynomial ring k[x_{1},x_{2},...] in infinitely many generators generated by the squares and cubes of all generators, and S is obtained from R by adjoining inverses to all elements not in any of the ideals generated by some x_{n}, then S is a 1-dimensional Noetherian domain that is not a J-1 ring as S has a cusp singularity at every closed point, so the set of singular points is not closed, though it is a G-ring. This ring is also universally catenary, as its localization at every prime ideal is a quotient of a regular ring.

=== A quasi-excellent ring that is not excellent ===
Nagata's example of a 2-dimensional Noetherian local ring that is catenary but not universally catenary is a G-ring, and is also a J-2 ring as any local G-ring is a J-2 ring (Matsumura 1980, p.88, 260). So it is a quasi-excellent catenary local ring that is not excellent.

== Resolution of singularities ==
Quasi-excellent rings are closely related to the problem of resolution of singularities, and this seems to have been Grothendieck's motivation^{pg 218} for defining them. Grothendieck (1965) observed that if it is possible to resolve singularities of all complete integral local Noetherian rings, then it is possible to resolve the singularities of all reduced quasi-excellent rings. Hironaka (1964) proved this for all complete integral Noetherian local rings over a field of characteristic 0, which implies his theorem that all singularities of excellent schemes over a field of characteristic 0 can be resolved. Conversely if it is possible to resolve all singularities of the spectra of all integral finite algebras over a Noetherian ring R then the ring R is quasi-excellent.
