= G-ring =

Type of ring in commutative algebra

In commutative algebra, a G-ring or Grothendieck ring is a Noetherian ring such that the map of any of its local rings to the completion is regular (defined below). Almost all Noetherian rings that occur naturally in algebraic geometry or number theory are G-rings, and it is quite hard to construct examples of Noetherian rings that are not G-rings. The concept is named after Alexander Grothendieck.

A ring that is both a G-ring and a J-2 ring is called a quasi-excellent ring, and if in addition it is universally catenary it is called an excellent ring.

== Definitions ==
- A (Noetherian) ring R containing a field k is called geometrically regular over k if for any finite extension K of k the ring R ⊗_{k} K is a regular ring.
- A homomorphism of rings from R to S is called regular if it is flat and for every p ∈ Spec(R) the fiber S ⊗_{R} k(p) is geometrically regular over the residue field k(p) of p. (see also Popescu's theorem.)
- A ring is called a local G-ring if it is a Noetherian local ring and the map to its completion (with respect to its maximal ideal) is regular.
- A ring is called a G-ring if it is Noetherian and all its localizations at prime ideals are local G-rings. (It is enough to check this just for the maximal ideals, so in particular local G-rings are G-rings.)

== Examples ==
- Every field is a G-ring.
- Every complete Noetherian local ring is a G-ring.
- Every ring of convergent power series in a finite number of variables over R or C is a G-ring.
- Every Dedekind domain in characteristic 0, and in particular the ring of integers, is a G-ring, but in positive characteristic there are Dedekind domains (and even discrete valuation rings) that are not G-rings.
- Every localization of a G-ring is a G-ring.
- Every finitely generated algebra over a G-ring is a G-ring. This is a theorem due to Grothendieck.

Here is an example of a discrete valuation ring A of characteristic p>0 which is not a G-ring. If k is any field of characteristic p with [k : k^{p}] = ∞ and R = k[[x]] and A is the subring of power series Σa_{i}x^{i} such that [k^{p}(a_{0},a_{1},...) : k^{p}] is finite then the formal fiber of A over the generic point is not geometrically regular so A is not a G-ring. Here k^{p} denotes the image of k under the Frobenius morphism a→a^{p}.
