= Weierstrass ring =

In mathematics, a Weierstrass ring, named by Nagata after Karl Weierstrass, is a commutative local ring that is Henselian, pseudo-geometric, and such that any quotient ring by a prime ideal is a finite extension of a regular local ring.

== Examples ==
- The Weierstrass preparation theorem can be used to show that the ring of convergent power series over the complex numbers in a finite number of variables is a Weierstrass ring. The same is true if the complex numbers are replaced by a perfect field with a valuation.
- Every ring that is a finitely-generated module over a Weierstrass ring is also a Weierstrass ring.

== Bibliography ==
- Danilov, V. I. (2001) [1994], "Weierstrass ring", Encyclopedia of Mathematics, EMS Press
- Nagata, Masayoshi (1975) [1962], Local rings, Interscience Tracts in Pure and Applied Mathematics, vol. 13, Interscience Publishers, pp. xiii+234, ISBN 978-0-88275-228-0, MR 0155856
