= Nagata ring =

In commutative algebra, an N-1 ring is an integral domain $A$ whose integral closure in its quotient field is a finitely generated $A$-module. It is called a Japanese ring (or an N-2 ring) if for every finite extension $L$ of its quotient field $K$, the integral closure of $A$ in $L$ is a finitely generated $A$-module (or equivalently a finite $A$-algebra). A ring is called universally Japanese if every finitely generated integral domain over it is Japanese, and is called a Nagata ring, named for Masayoshi Nagata, or a pseudo-geometric ring if it is Noetherian and universally Japanese (or, which turns out to be the same, if it is Noetherian and all of its quotients by a prime ideal are N-2 rings). A ring is called geometric if it is the local ring of an algebraic variety or a completion of such a local ring, but this concept is not used much.

== Examples ==
Fields and rings of polynomials or power series in finitely many indeterminates over fields are examples of Japanese rings. Another important example is a Noetherian integrally closed domain (e.g. a Dedekind domain) having a perfect field of fractions. On the other hand, a principal ideal domain or even a discrete valuation ring is not necessarily Japanese.

Any quasi-excellent ring is a Nagata ring, so in particular almost all Noetherian rings that occur in algebraic geometry are Nagata rings. The first example of a Noetherian domain that is not a Nagata ring was given by Akizuki (1935).

Here is an example of a discrete valuation ring that is not a Japanese ring. Choose a prime $p$ and an infinite degree field extension $K$ of a characteristic $p$ field $k$, such that $K^p\subseteq k$. Let the discrete valuation ring $R$ be the ring of formal power series over $K$ whose coefficients generate a finite extension of $k$. If $y$ is any formal power series not in $R$ then the ring $R[y]$ is not an N-1 ring (its integral closure is not a finitely generated module) so $R$ is not a Japanese ring.

If $R$ is the subring of the polynomial ring $k[x_1, x_2, ...]$ in infinitely many generators generated by the squares and cubes of all generators, and $S$ is obtained from $R$ by adjoining inverses to all elements not in any of the ideals generated by some $x_n$, then $S$ is a 1-dimensional Noetherian domain that is not an N-1 ring, in other words its integral closure in its quotient field is not a finitely generated $S$-module. Also $S$ has a cusp singularity at every closed point, so the set of singular points is not closed.

== Citations ==
=== References ===
- Akizuki, Y. (1935), "Einige Bemerkungen über primäre Integritätsbereiche mit teilerkettensatz", Proceedings of the Physico-Mathematical Society of Japan, 3rd Series, 17: 327–336
- Bosch, Güntzer, Remmert, Non-Archimedean Analysis, Springer 1984, ISBN 0-387-12546-9
- Danilov, V.I. (2001) [1994], "geometric ring", Encyclopedia of Mathematics, EMS Press
- A. Grothendieck, J. Dieudonné, Eléments de géométrie algébrique, Ch. 0_{IV} § 23, Publ. Math. IHÉS 20, (1964).
- H. Matsumura, Commutative algebra ISBN 0-8053-7026-9, chapter 12.
- Nagata, Masayoshi Local rings. Interscience Tracts in Pure and Applied Mathematics, No. 13 Interscience Publishers a division of John Wiley & Sons, New York-London 1962, reprinted by R. E. Krieger Pub. Co (1975) ISBN 0-88275-228-6
