= Acceptable ring =

In mathematics, an acceptable ring is a generalization of an excellent ring, with the conditions about regular rings in the definition of an excellent ring replaced by conditions about Gorenstein rings. Acceptable rings were introduced by Sharp (1977).

All finite-dimensional Gorenstein rings are acceptable, as are all finitely generated algebras over acceptable rings and all localizations of acceptable rings.
