= Integrally closed =

In mathematics, more specifically in abstract algebra, the concept of integrally closed has three meanings:

- A commutative ring $R$ contained in a commutative ring $S$ is said to be integrally closed in $S$ if $R$ is equal to the integral closure of $R$ in $S$.
- An integral domain $R$ is said to be integrally closed if it is equal to its integral closure in its field of fractions.
- An ordered group G is called integrally closed if for all elements a and b of G, if a^{n} ≤ b for all natural numbers n then a ≤ 1.
