= Analytically normal ring =

In commutative algebra, an analytically normal ring is a local ring whose completion is a normal ring; in other words, an integral domain that is integrally closed in its quotient field.

Zariski proved that if a local ring of an algebraic variety is normal, then it is analytically normal, which is in some sense a variation of Zariski's main theorem. Nagata gave an example of a normal Noetherian local ring that is analytically reducible and therefore not analytically normal.
