= G Ring =

G Ring may refer to:

- G Ring, a ring of Saturn
- G-ring or Grothendieck ring, a type of commutative ring in algebra
