= Normal homomorphism =

Algebraic correspondence

In algebra, a normal homomorphism is a ring homomorphism $R \to S$ that is flat and is such that for every field extension L of the residue field $\kappa(\mathfrak{p})$ of any prime ideal $\mathfrak{p}$, $L \otimes_R S$ is a normal ring.
