= Henselian ring =

Local ring in which Hensel's lemma holds

In mathematics, a Henselian ring (or Hensel ring) is a local ring in which Hensel's lemma holds. They were introduced by Azumaya (1951), who named them after Kurt Hensel. Azumaya originally allowed Henselian rings to be non-commutative, but most authors now restrict them to be commutative.

Some standard references for Hensel rings are (Nagata 1975, Chapter VII), (Raynaud 1970), and (Grothendieck 1967, Chapter 18).

== Definitions ==
In this article rings will be assumed to be commutative, though there is also a theory of non-commutative Henselian rings.

- A local ring R with maximal ideal m is called Henselian if Hensel's lemma holds. This means that if P is a monic polynomial in R[x], then any factorization of its image P in (R/m)[x] into a product of coprime monic polynomials can be lifted to a factorization in R[x].
- A local ring is Henselian if and only if every finite ring extension is a product of local rings.
- A Henselian local ring is called strictly Henselian if its residue field is separably closed.
- By abuse of terminology, a field $K$ with valuation $v$ is said to be Henselian if its valuation ring is Henselian. That is the case if and only if $v$ extends uniquely to every finite extension of $K$ (resp. to every finite separable extension of $K$, resp. to $K^{alg}$, resp. to $K^{sep}$).
- A ring is called Henselian if it is a direct product of a finite number of Henselian local rings.

=== Properties ===
- Assume that $(K, v)$ is a Henselian field. Then every algebraic extension of $K$ is henselian (by the fourth definition above).
- If $(K, v)$ is a Henselian field and $\alpha$ is algebraic over $K$, then for every conjugate $\alpha'$ of $\alpha$ over $K$, $v(\alpha') = v(\alpha)$. This follows from the fourth definition, and from the fact that for every K-automorphism $\sigma$ of $K^{alg}$, $v\circ \sigma$ is an extension of $v|_K$. The converse of this assertion also holds, because for a normal field extension $L/K$, the extensions of $v$ to $L$ are known to be conjugated.

== Henselian rings in algebraic geometry ==
Henselian rings are the local rings with respect to the Nisnevich topology in the sense that if $R$ is a Henselian local ring, and $\{U_i \to X\}$ is a Nisnevich covering of $X = Spec(R)$, then one of the $U_i \to X$ is an isomorphism. This should be compared to the fact that for any Zariski open covering $\{U_i \to X\}$ of the spectrum $X = Spec(R)$ of a local ring $R$, one of the $U_i \to X$ is an isomorphism. In fact, this property characterises Henselian rings, resp. local rings.

Likewise strict Henselian rings are the local rings of geometric points in the étale topology.

== Henselization ==
For any local ring A there is a universal Henselian ring B generated by A, called the Henselization of A, introduced by Nagata (1953), such that any local homomorphism from A to a Henselian ring can be extended uniquely to B. The Henselization of A is unique up to unique isomorphism. The Henselization of A is an algebraic substitute for the completion of A. The Henselization of A has the same completion and residue field as A and is a flat module over A. If A is Noetherian, reduced, normal, regular, or excellent then so is its Henselization. For example, the Henselization of the ring of polynomials k[x,y,...] localized at the point (0,0,...) is the ring of algebraic formal power series (the formal power series satisfying an algebraic equation). This can be thought of as the "algebraic" part of the completion.

Similarly there is a strictly Henselian ring generated by A, called the strict Henselization of A. The strict Henselization is not quite universal: it is unique, but only up to non-unique isomorphism. More precisely it depends on the choice of a separable algebraic closure of the residue field of A, and automorphisms of this separable algebraic closure correspond to automorphisms of the corresponding strict Henselization. For example, a strict Henselization of the field of p-adic numbers is given by the maximal unramified extension, generated by all roots of unity of order prime to p. It is not "universal" as it has non-trivial automorphisms.

== Examples ==
- Every field is a Henselian local ring. (But not every field with valuation is "Henselian" in the sense of the fourth definition above.)
- Complete Hausdorff local rings, such as the ring of p-adic integers and rings of formal power series over a field, are Henselian.
- The rings of convergent power series over the real or complex numbers are Henselian.
- Rings of algebraic power series over a field are Henselian.
- A local ring that is integral over a Henselian ring is Henselian.
- The Henselization of a local ring is a Henselian local ring.
- Every quotient of a Henselian ring is Henselian.
- A ring A is Henselian if and only if the associated reduced ring A_{red} is Henselian (this is the quotient of A by the ideal of nilpotent elements).
- If A has only one prime ideal then it is Henselian since A_{red} is a field.
