= Deviation of a local ring =

In commutative algebra, the deviations of a local ring R are certain invariants ε_{i}(R) that measure how far the ring is from being regular.

== Definition ==
The deviations ε_{n} of a local ring R with residue field k are non-negative integers defined in terms of its Poincaré series P(t) by

$$P(t)=\sum_{n\ge 0}t^n \operatorname{Tor}^R_n(k,k) = \prod_{n\ge 0} \frac{(1+t^{2n+1})^{\varepsilon_{2n}}}{(1-t^{2n+2})^{\varepsilon_{2n+1}}}.$$

The zeroth deviation ε_{0} is the embedding dimension of R (the dimension of its tangent space). The first deviation ε_{1} vanishes exactly when the ring R is a regular local ring, in which case all the higher deviations also vanish. The second deviation ε_{2} vanishes exactly when the ring R is a complete intersection ring, in which case all the higher deviations vanish.
