= Integral element =

Mathematical element

In commutative algebra, an element b of a commutative ring B is said to be integral over a subring A of B if b is a root of some monic polynomial over A.

If A, B are fields, then the notions of "integral over" and of an "integral extension" are precisely "algebraic over" and "algebraic extensions" in field theory (since the root of any polynomial is the root of a monic polynomial).

The case of greatest interest in number theory is that of complex numbers integral over Z (e.g., $\sqrt{2}$ or $1+i$); in this context, the integral elements are usually called algebraic integers. The algebraic integers in a finite extension field k of the rationals Q form a subring of k, called the ring of integers of k, a central object of study in algebraic number theory.

In this article, the term ring will be understood to mean commutative ring with a multiplicative identity.

== Definition ==
Let $B$ be a ring and let $A \subset B$ be a subring of $B.$ An element $b$ of $B$ is said to be integral over $A$ if for some $n \geq 1,$ there exists $a_0,\ a_1, \ \dots,\ a_{n-1}$ in $A$ such that
$$b^n + a_{n-1} b^{n-1} + \cdots + a_1 b + a_0 = 0.$$

The set of elements of $B$ that are integral over $A$ is called the integral closure of $A$ in $B.$ The integral closure of any subring $A$ in $B$ is, itself, a subring of $B$ and contains $A.$ If every element of $B$ is integral over $A,$ then we say that $B$ is integral over $A$, or equivalently $B$ is an integral extension of $A.$

== Examples ==
=== Integral closure in algebraic number theory ===
There are many examples of integral closure which can be found in algebraic number theory since it is fundamental for defining the ring of integers for an algebraic field extension $K/\mathbb{Q}$ (or $L/\mathbb{Q}_p$).

==== Integral closure of integers in rationals ====
Integers are the only elements of Q that are integral over Z. In other words, Z is the integral closure of Z in Q.

==== Quadratic extensions ====
The Gaussian integers are the complex numbers of the form $a + b \sqrt{-1},\, a, b \in \mathbf{Z}$, and are integral over Z. $\mathbf{Z}[\sqrt{-1}]$ is then the integral closure of Z in $\mathbf{Q}(\sqrt{-1})$. Typically this ring is denoted $\mathcal{O}_{\mathbb{Q}[i]}$.

The integral closure of Z in $\mathbf{Q}(\sqrt{5})$ is the ring

$$\mathcal{O}_{\mathbb{Q}[\sqrt{5}]} = \mathbb{Z}\!\left[ \frac{1 + \sqrt{5}}{2} \right]$$

This example and the previous one are examples of quadratic integers. The integral closure of a quadratic extension $\mathbb{Q}(\sqrt{d})$ can be found by constructing the minimal polynomial of an arbitrary element $a + b \sqrt{d}$ and finding number-theoretic criterion for the polynomial to have integral coefficients. This analysis can be found in the quadratic extensions article.

==== Roots of unity ====
Let ζ be a root of unity. Then the integral closure of Z in the cyclotomic field Q(ζ) is Z[ζ]. This can be found by using the minimal polynomial and using Eisenstein's criterion.

==== Ring of algebraic integers ====
The integral closure of Z in the field of complex numbers C, or the algebraic closure $\overline{\mathbb{Q}}$ is called the ring of algebraic integers.

==== Other ====
The roots of unity, nilpotent elements and idempotent elements in any ring are integral over Z.

=== Integral closure in algebraic geometry ===
In geometry, integral closure is closely related with normalization and normal schemes. It is the first step in resolution of singularities since it gives a process for resolving singularities of codimension 1.

- For example, the integral closure of $\mathbb{C}[x,y,z]/(xy)$ is the ring $\mathbb{C}[x,z] \times \mathbb{C}[y,z]$ since geometrically, the first ring corresponds to the $xz$-plane unioned with the $yz$-plane. They have a codimension 1 singularity along the $z$-axis where they intersect.
- Let a finite group G act on a ring A. Then A is integral over A^{G}, the set of elements fixed by G; see Ring of invariants.
- Let R be a ring and u a unit in a ring containing R. Then
1. u^{−1} is integral over R if and only if u^{−1} ∈ R[u].
2. $R[u] \cap R[u^{-1}]$ is integral over R.
3. The integral closure of the homogeneous coordinate ring of a normal projective variety X is the ring of sections

$$\bigoplus_{n \ge 0} \operatorname{H}^0(X, \mathcal{O}_X(n)).$$

=== Integrality in algebra ===
- If $\overline{k}$ is an algebraic closure of a field k, then $\overline{k}[x_1, \dots, x_n]$ is integral over $k[x_1, \dots, x_n].$
- The integral closure of C[[x]] in a finite extension of C((x)) is of the form $\mathbf{C}[[x^{1/n}]]$ (cf. Puiseux series)

== Equivalent definitions ==
Let B be a ring, and let A be a subring of B. Given an element b in B, the following conditions are equivalent:

(i) b is integral over A;
(ii) the subring A[b] of B generated by A and b is a finitely generated A-module;
(iii) there exists a subring C of B containing A[b] and which is a finitely generated A-module;
(iv) there exists a faithful A[b]-module M such that M is finitely generated as an A-module.

The usual proof of this uses the following variant of the Cayley–Hamilton theorem on determinants:

Theorem Let u be an endomorphism of an A-module M generated by n elements and I an ideal of A such that $u(M) \subset IM$. Then there is a relation:

$$u^n + a_1 u^{n-1} + \cdots + a_{n-1} u + a_n = 0, \, a_i \in I^i.$$

This theorem (with I = A and u multiplication by b) gives (iv) ⇒ (i) and the rest is easy. Coincidentally, Nakayama's lemma is also an immediate consequence of this theorem.

== Elementary properties ==
=== Integral closure forms a ring ===
It follows from the above four equivalent statements that the set of elements of $B$ that are integral over $A$ forms a subring of $B$ containing $A$. (Proof: If x, y are elements of $B$ that are integral over $A$, then $x + y, xy, -x$ are integral over $A$ since they stabilize $A[x]A[y]$, which is a finitely generated module over $A$ and is annihilated only by zero.) This ring is called the integral closure of $A$ in $B$.

=== Transitivity of integrality ===
Another consequence of the above equivalence is that "integrality" is transitive, in the following sense. Let $C$ be a ring containing $B$ and $c \in C$. If $c$ is integral over $B$ and $B$ integral over $A$, then $c$ is integral over $A$. In particular, if $C$ is itself integral over $B$ and $B$ is integral over $A$, then $C$ is also integral over $A$.

=== Integral closed in fraction field ===
If $A$ happens to be the integral closure of $A$ in $B$, then A is said to be integrally closed in $B$. If $B$ is the total ring of fractions of $A$, (e.g., the field of fractions when $A$ is an integral domain), then one sometimes drops the qualification "in $B$" and simply says "integral closure of $A$" and "$A$ is integrally closed." For example, the ring of integers $\mathcal{O}_K$ is integrally closed in the field $K$.

==== Transitivity of integral closure with integrally closed domains ====
Let A be an integral domain with the field of fractions K and A' the integral closure of A in an algebraic field extension L of K. Then the field of fractions of A' is L. In particular, A' is an integrally closed domain.

===== Transitivity in algebraic number theory =====
This situation is applicable in algebraic number theory when relating the ring of integers and a field extension. In particular, given a field extension $L/K$ the integral closure of $\mathcal{O}_K$ in $L$ is the ring of integers $\mathcal{O}_L$.

==== Remarks ====
Note that transitivity of integrality above implies that if $B$ is integral over $A$, then $B$ is a union (equivalently an inductive limit) of subrings that are finitely generated $A$-modules.

If $A$ is noetherian, transitivity of integrality can be weakened to the statement:

There exists a finitely generated $A$-submodule of $B$ that contains $A[b]$.

=== Relation with finiteness conditions ===
Finally, the assumption that $A$ be a subring of $B$ can be modified a bit. If $f:A \to B$ is a ring homomorphism, then one says $f$ is integral if $B$ is integral over $f(A)$. In the same way one says $f$ is finite ($B$ finitely generated $A$-module) or of finite type ($B$ finitely generated $A$-algebra). In this viewpoint, one has that

$f$ is finite if and only if $f$ is integral and of finite type.

Or more explicitly,

$B$ is a finitely generated $A$-module if and only if $B$ is generated as an $A$-algebra by a finite number of elements integral over $A$.

== Integral extensions ==
=== Cohen-Seidenberg theorems ===
An integral extension A ⊆ B has the going-up property, the lying over property, and the incomparability property (Cohen–Seidenberg theorems). Explicitly, given a chain of prime ideals $\mathfrak{p}_1 \subset \cdots \subset \mathfrak{p}_n$ in A there exists a $\mathfrak{p}'_1 \subset \cdots \subset \mathfrak{p}'_n$ in B with $\mathfrak{p}_i = \mathfrak{p}'_i \cap A$ (going-up and lying over) and two distinct prime ideals with inclusion relation cannot contract to the same prime ideal (incomparability). In particular, the Krull dimensions of A and B are the same. Furthermore, if A is an integrally closed domain, then the going-down holds (see below).

In general, the going-up implies the lying-over. Thus, in the below, we simply say the "going-up" to mean "going-up" and "lying-over".

When A, B are domains such that B is integral over A, A is a field if and only if B is a field. As a corollary, one has: given a prime ideal $\mathfrak{q}$ of B, $\mathfrak{q}$ is a maximal ideal of B if and only if $\mathfrak{q} \cap A$ is a maximal ideal of A. Another corollary: if L/K is an algebraic extension, then any subring of L containing K is a field.

==== Applications ====
Let B be a ring that is integral over a subring A and k an algebraically closed field. If $f: A \to k$ is a homomorphism, then f extends to a homomorphism B → k. This follows from the going-up.

==== Geometric interpretation of going-up ====
Let $f: A \to B$ be an integral extension of rings. Then the induced map

$$\begin{cases} f^\#: \operatorname{Spec} B \to \operatorname{Spec} A \\ p \mapsto f^{-1}(p)\end{cases}$$

is a closed map; in fact, $f^\#(V(I)) = V(f^{-1}(I))$ for any ideal I and $f^\#$ is surjective if f is injective. This is a geometric interpretation of the going-up.

==== Geometric interpretation of integral extensions ====
Let B be a ring and A a subring that is a noetherian integrally closed domain (i.e., $\operatorname{Spec} A$ is a normal scheme). If B is integral over A, then $\operatorname{Spec} B \to \operatorname{Spec} A$ is submersive; i.e., the topology of $\operatorname{Spec} A$ is the quotient topology. The proof uses the notion of constructible sets. (See also: Torsor (algebraic geometry).)

=== Integrality, base-change, universally-closed, and geometry ===
If $B$ is integral over $A$, then $B \otimes_A R$ is integral over R for any A-algebra R. In particular, $\operatorname{Spec} (B \otimes_A R) \to \operatorname{Spec} R$ is closed; i.e., the integral extension induces a "universally closed" map. This leads to a geometric characterization of integral extension. Namely, let B be a ring with only finitely many minimal prime ideals (e.g., integral domain or noetherian ring). Then B is integral over a (subring) A if and only if $\operatorname{Spec} (B \otimes_A R) \to \operatorname{Spec} R$ is closed for any A-algebra R. In particular, every proper map is universally closed.

=== Galois actions on integral extensions of integrally closed domains ===
Proposition. Let A be an integrally closed domain with the field of fractions K, L a finite normal extension of K, B the integral closure of A in L. Then the group $G = \operatorname{Gal}(L/K)$ acts transitively on each fiber of $\operatorname{Spec} B \to \operatorname{Spec} A$.

Proof. Suppose $\mathfrak{p}_2 \ne \sigma(\mathfrak{p}_1)$ for any $\sigma$ in G. Then, by prime avoidance, there is an element x in $\mathfrak{p}_2$ such that $\sigma(x) \not\in \mathfrak{p}_1$ for any $\sigma$. G fixes the element $y = \prod\nolimits_{\sigma} \sigma(x)$ and thus y is purely inseparable over K. Then some power $y^e$ belongs to K; since A is integrally closed we have: $y^e \in A.$ Thus, we found $y^e$ is in $\mathfrak{p}_2 \cap A$ but not in $\mathfrak{p}_1 \cap A$; i.e., $\mathfrak{p}_1 \cap A \ne \mathfrak{p}_2 \cap A$.

==== Application to algebraic number theory ====
The Galois group $\operatorname{Gal}(L/K)$ then acts on all of the prime ideals $\mathfrak{q}_1,\ldots, \mathfrak{q}_k \in \text{Spec}(\mathcal{O}_L)$ lying over a fixed prime ideal $\mathfrak{p} \in \text{Spec}(\mathcal{O}_K)$. That is, if

$$\mathfrak{p} = \mathfrak{q}_1^{e_1}\cdots\mathfrak{q}_k^{e_k} \subset \mathcal{O}_L$$

then there is a Galois action on the set $S_\mathfrak{p} = \{\mathfrak{q}_1,\ldots,\mathfrak{q}_k \}$. This is called the Splitting of prime ideals in Galois extensions.

==== Remarks ====
The same idea in the proof shows that if $L/K$ is a purely inseparable extension (need not be normal), then $\operatorname{Spec} B \to \operatorname{Spec} A$ is bijective.

Let A, K, etc. as before but assume L is only a finite field extension of K. Then

(i) $\operatorname{Spec} B \to \operatorname{Spec} A$ has finite fibers.
(ii) the going-down holds between A and B: given $\mathfrak{p}_1 \subset \cdots \subset \mathfrak{p}_n = \mathfrak{p}'_n \cap A$, there exists $\mathfrak{p}'_1 \subset \cdots \subset \mathfrak{p}'_n$ that contracts to it.

Indeed, in both statements, by enlarging L, we can assume L is a normal extension. Then (i) is immediate. As for (ii), by the going-up, we can find a chain $\mathfrak{p}''_i$ that contracts to $\mathfrak{p}'_i$. By transitivity, there is $\sigma \in G$ such that $\sigma(\mathfrak{p}''_n) = \mathfrak{p}'_n$ and then $\mathfrak{p}'_i = \sigma(\mathfrak{p}''_i)$ are the desired chain.

== Integral closure ==
Let A ⊂ B be rings and A' the integral closure of A in B. (See above for the definition.)

Integral closures behave nicely under various constructions. Specifically, for a multiplicatively closed subset S of A, the localization S^{−1}A' is the integral closure of S^{−1}A in S^{−1}B, and $A'[t]$ is the integral closure of $A[t]$ in $B[t]$. If $A_i$ are subrings of rings $B_i, 1 \le i \le n$, then the integral closure of $\prod A_i$ in $\prod B_i$ is $\prod {A_i}'$ where ${A_i}'$ are the integral closures of $A_i$ in $B_i$.

The integral closure of a local ring A in, say, B, need not be local. (If this is the case, the ring is called unibranch.) This is the case for example when A is Henselian and B is a field extension of the field of fractions of A.

If A is a subring of a field K, then the integral closure of A in K is the intersection of all valuation rings of K containing A.

Let A be an $\mathbb{N}$-graded subring of an $\mathbb{N}$-graded ring B. Then the integral closure of A in B is an $\mathbb{N}$-graded subring of B.

There is also a concept of the integral closure of an ideal. The integral closure of an ideal $I \subset R$, usually denoted by $\overline I$, is the set of all elements $r \in R$ such that there exists a monic polynomial

$$x^n + a_{1} x^{n-1} + \cdots + a_{n-1} x^1 + a_n$$

with $a_i \in I^i$ with $r$ as a root. The radical of an ideal is integrally closed.

For noetherian rings, there are alternate definitions as well.

- $r \in \overline I$ if there exists a $c \in R$ not contained in any minimal prime, such that $c r^n \in I^n$ for all $n \ge 1$.
- $r \in \overline I$ if in the normalized blow-up of I, the pull back of r is contained in the inverse image of I. The blow-up of an ideal is an operation of schemes which replaces the given ideal with a principal ideal. The normalization of a scheme is simply the scheme corresponding to the integral closure of all of its rings.

The notion of integral closure of an ideal is used in some proofs of the going-down theorem.

== Conductor ==
Let B be a ring and A a subring of B such that B is integral over A. Then the annihilator of the A-module B/A is called the conductor of A in B. Because the notion has origin in algebraic number theory, the conductor is denoted by $\mathfrak{f} = \mathfrak{f}(B/A)$. Explicitly, $\mathfrak{f}$ consists of elements a in A such that $aB \subset A$. (cf. idealizer in abstract algebra.) It is the largest ideal of A that is also an ideal of B. If S is a multiplicatively closed subset of A, then

$$S^{-1}\mathfrak{f}(B/A) = \mathfrak{f}(S^{-1}B/S^{-1}A)$$.

If B is a subring of the total ring of fractions of A, then we may identify

$$\mathfrak{f}(B/A)=\operatorname{Hom}_A(B, A)$$.

Example: Let k be a field and let $A = k[t^2, t^3] \subset B = k[t]$ (i.e., A is the coordinate ring of the affine curve $x^2 = y^3$). B is the integral closure of A in $k(t)$. The conductor of A in B is the ideal $(t^2, t^3) A$. More generally, the conductor of $A = k[[t^a, t^b]]$, a, b relatively prime, is $(t^c, t^{c+1}, \dots) A$ with $c = (a-1)(b-1)$.

Suppose B is the integral closure of an integral domain A in the field of fractions of A such that the A-module $B/A$ is finitely generated. Then the conductor $\mathfrak{f}$ of A is an ideal defining the support of $B/A$; thus, A coincides with B in the complement of $V(\mathfrak{f})$ in $\operatorname{Spec}A$. In particular, the set $\{ \mathfrak{p} \in \operatorname{Spec}A \mid A_\mathfrak{p} \text{ is integrally closed} \}$, the complement of $V(\mathfrak{f})$, is an open set.

== Finiteness of integral closure ==
An important but difficult question is on the finiteness of the integral closure of a finitely generated algebra. There are several known results.

The integral closure of a Dedekind domain in a finite extension of the field of fractions is a Dedekind domain; in particular, a noetherian ring. This is a consequence of the Krull–Akizuki theorem. In general, the integral closure of a noetherian domain of dimension at most 2 is noetherian; Nagata gave an example of dimension 3 noetherian domain whose integral closure is not noetherian. A nicer statement is this: the integral closure of a noetherian domain is a Krull domain (Mori–Nagata theorem). Nagata also gave an example of dimension 1 noetherian local domain such that the integral closure is not finite over that domain.

Let A be a noetherian integrally closed domain with field of fractions K. If L/K is a finite separable extension, then the integral closure $A'$ of A in L is a finitely generated A-module. This is easy and standard (uses the fact that the trace defines a non-degenerate bilinear form).

Let A be a finitely generated algebra over a field k that is an integral domain with field of fractions K. If L is a finite extension of K, then the integral closure $A'$ of A in L is a finitely generated A-module and is also a finitely generated k-algebra. The result is due to Noether and can be shown using the Noether normalization lemma as follows. It is clear that it is enough to show the assertion when L/K is either separable or purely inseparable. The separable case is noted above, so assume L/K is purely inseparable. By the normalization lemma, A is integral over the polynomial ring $S = k[x_1, ..., x_d]$. Since L/K is a finite purely inseparable extension, there is a power q of a prime number such that every element of L is a q-th root of an element in K. Let $k'$ be a finite extension of k containing all q-th roots of coefficients of finitely many rational functions that generate L. Then we have: $L \subset k'(x_1^{1/q}, ..., x_d^{1/q}).$ The ring on the right is the field of fractions of $k'[x_1^{1/q}, ..., x_d^{1/q}]$, which is the integral closure of S; thus, contains $A'$. Hence, $A'$ is finite over S; a fortiori, over A. The result remains true if we replace k by Z.

The integral closure of a complete local noetherian domain A in a finite extension of the field of fractions of A is finite over A. More precisely, for a local noetherian ring R, we have the following chains of implications:

(i) A complete $\Rightarrow$ A is a Nagata ring
(ii) A is a Nagata domain $\Rightarrow$ A analytically unramified $\Rightarrow$ the integral closure of the completion $\widehat{A}$ is finite over $\widehat{A}$ $\Rightarrow$ the integral closure of A is finite over A.

== The Grauert–Remmert–de Jong Criterion ==
The Grauert–Remmert–de Jong criterion provides a necessary and sufficient condition for a ring to be normal.

=== The Criterion ===
Let $A$ be a reduced Noetherian domain and $I \subset A$ be an ideal satisfying the following conditions:

1. $I$ is a radical ideal (i.e., $\sqrt{I} = I$).
2. The variety $V(I)$ contains the non-normal locus of $I$ (i.e., for every prime ideal $P \in \operatorname{Spec}(A)$ where the local ring $A_P$ is not normal, $P \supseteq I$).

Then: the ring $A$ is normal if and only if the natural inclusion into the endomorphism ring of $I$

$$\phi: A \hookrightarrow \operatorname{Hom}_A(I, I)$$

is an isomorphism.

=== Algorithmic Application (The de Jong Algorithm) ===
If $A$ is not normal, the endomorphism ring $S = \operatorname{Hom}_A(I, I)$ provides a strictly larger integral ring extension $A \subsetneq S$ within the quotient field $Q(A)$.

- Iteration: By iteratively constructing a sequence of ring extensions $A = A_0 \subset A_1 \subset A_2 \subset \dots \subset \overline{A}$, the procedure finally leads to the normalization $\overline{A}$, provided that the normalization is a finitely generated module over $A$.
- Generalization of the Zassenhaus Algorithm: This approach generalizes the Zassenhaus algorithm (also known as the Round-Two algorithm) from the specific context of rings of integers in number fields to general Noetherian rings.

== Noether's normalization lemma ==
Noether's normalisation lemma is a theorem in commutative algebra. Given a field K and a finitely generated K-algebra A, the theorem says it is possible to find elements y_{1}, y_{2}, ..., y_{m} in A that are algebraically independent over K such that A is finite (and hence integral) over B = K[y_{1},..., y_{m}]. Thus the extension K ⊂ A can be written as a composite K ⊂ B ⊂ A where K ⊂ B is a purely transcendental extension and B ⊂ A is finite.

== Integral morphisms ==
In algebraic geometry, a morphism $f:X \to Y$ of schemes is integral if it is affine and if for some (equivalently, every) affine open cover $U_i$ of Y, every map $f^{-1}(U_i)\to U_i$ is of the form $\operatorname{Spec}(A)\to\operatorname{Spec}(B)$ where A is an integral B-algebra. The class of integral morphisms is more general than the class of finite morphisms because there are integral extensions that are not finite, such as, in many cases, the algebraic closure of a field over the field.

== Absolute integral closure ==
Let A be an integral domain and L (some) algebraic closure of the field of fractions of A. Then the integral closure $A^+$ of A in L is called the absolute integral closure of A. It is unique up to a non-canonical isomorphism. The ring of all algebraic integers is an example (and thus $A^+$ is typically not noetherian).

== See also ==
- Normal scheme
- Noether normalization lemma
- Algebraic integer
- Splitting of prime ideals in Galois extensions
- Torsor (algebraic geometry)
