= Congruence ideal =

In algebra, the congruence ideal of a surjective ring homomorphism f : B → C of commutative rings is the image under f of the annihilator of the kernel of f.

It is called a congruence ideal because when B is a Hecke algebra and f is a homomorphism corresponding to a modular form, the congruence ideal describes congruences between the modular form of f and other modular forms.

== Example ==
- Suppose C and D are rings with homomorphisms to a ring E, and let B = C×_{E}D be the pullback, given by the subring of C×D of pairs (c,d) where c and d have the same image in E. If f is the natural projection from B to C, then the kernel is the ideal J of elements (0,d) where d has image 0 in E. If J has annihilator 0 in D, then its annihilator in B is just the kernel I of the map from C to E. So the congruence ideal of f is the ideal (I,0) of B.
- Suppose that B is the Hecke algebra generated by Hecke operators T_{n} acting on the 2-dimensional space of modular forms of level 1 and weight 12.This space is 2 dimensional, spanned by the Eigenforms given by the Eisenstein series E_{12} and the modular discriminant Δ. The map taking a Hecke operator T_{n} to its eigenvalues (σ_{11}(n),τ(n)) gives a homomorphism from B into the ring Z×Z (where τ is the Ramanujan tau function and σ_{11}(n) is the sum of the 11th powers of the divisors of n). The image is the set of pairs (c,d) with c and d congruent mod 619 because of Ramanujan's congruence σ_{11}(n) ≡ τ(n) mod 691. If f is the homomorphism taking (c,d) to c in Z, then the congruence ideal is (691). So the congruence ideal describes the congruences between the forms E_{12} and Δ.
