= Analytically irreducible ring =

In algebra, an analytically irreducible ring is a local ring whose completion has no zero divisors. Geometrically this corresponds to a variety with only one analytic branch at a point.

Zariski (1948) proved that if a local ring of an algebraic variety is a normal ring, then it is analytically irreducible. There are many examples of reduced and irreducible local rings that are analytically reducible, such as the local ring of a node of an irreducible curve, but it is hard to find examples that are also normal. Nagata (1958, 1962, Appendix A1, example 7) gave such an example of a normal Noetherian local ring that is analytically reducible.

== Nagata's example ==
Suppose that K is a field of characteristic not 2, and K [[x,y]] is the formal power series ring over K in 2 variables. Let R be the subring of K [[x,y]] generated by x, y, and the elements z_{n} and localized at these elements, where

$w=\sum_{m>0} a_mx^m$ is transcendental over K(x)
$$z_1=(y+w)^2$$
$$z_{n+1}=(z_1-(y+\sum_{0<m<n}a_mx^m)^2)/x^n$$.

Then R[X]/(X^{2}–z_{1}) is a normal Noetherian local ring that is analytically reducible.
