= Complete intersection ring =

In commutative algebra, a complete intersection ring is a commutative ring similar to the coordinate rings of varieties that are complete intersections. Informally, they can be thought of roughly as the local rings that can be defined using the "minimum possible" number of relations.

For Noetherian local rings, there is the following chain of inclusions:

Universally catenary rings ⊃ Cohen–Macaulay rings ⊃ Gorenstein rings ⊃ complete intersection rings ⊃ regular local rings

== Definition ==
A local complete intersection ring is a Noetherian local ring whose completion is the quotient of a regular local ring by an ideal generated by a regular sequence. Taking the completion is a minor technical complication caused by the fact that not all local rings are quotients of regular ones. For rings that are quotients of regular local rings, which covers most local rings that occur in algebraic geometry, it is not necessary to take completions in the definition.

There is an alternative intrinsic definition that does not depend on embedding the ring in a regular local ring. If R is a Noetherian local ring with maximal ideal m, then the dimension of m/m^{2} is called the embedding dimension emb dim (R) of R. Define a graded algebra H(R) as the homology of the Koszul complex with respect to a minimal system of generators of m/m^{2}; up to isomorphism this only depends on R and not on the choice of the generators of m. The dimension of H_{1}(R) is denoted by ε_{1} and is called the first deviation of R; it vanishes if and only if R is regular. A Noetherian local ring is called a complete intersection ring if its embedding dimension is the sum of the dimension and the first deviation:

emb dim(R) = dim(R) + ε_{1}(R).

There is also a recursive characterization of local complete intersection rings that can be used as a definition, as follows. Suppose that R is a complete Noetherian local ring. If R has dimension greater than 0 and x is an element in the maximal ideal that is not a zero divisor then R is a complete intersection ring if and only if R/(x) is. (If the maximal ideal consists entirely of zero divisors then R is not a complete intersection ring.) If R has dimension 0, then Wiebe (1969) showed that it is a complete intersection ring if and only if the Fitting ideal of its maximal ideal is non-zero.

== Examples ==
=== Regular local rings ===
Regular local rings are complete intersection rings, but the converse is not true: the ring $k[x]/(x^2)$ is a 0-dimensional complete intersection ring that is not regular.

=== Not a complete intersection ===
An example of a locally complete intersection ring which is not a complete intersection ring is given by $k[x,y]/(y-x^2, x^3)$ which has length 3 since it is isomorphic as a $k$ vector space to $k\oplus k\cdot x \oplus k \cdot x^2$.

=== Counterexample ===
Complete intersection local rings are Gorenstein rings, but the converse is not true: the ring $k[x,y,z]/(x^2, y^2, xz, yz, z^2 - xy)=R/I$ is a 0-dimensional Gorenstein ring that is not a complete intersection ring. As a $k$-vector space this ring is isomorphic to

$\frac{k[x,y,z]}{(x^2, y^2, xz, yz, z^2 - xy)} \cong R_0 \oplus R_1 \oplus R_2$, where $R_0 = k\cdot 1, R_1 = k \cdot x \oplus k \cdot y \oplus k\cdot z$, and $R_2 = k\cdot z^2$

showing it is Gorenstein since the top-degree component is dimension $1$ and it satisfies the Poincaré property. It is not a local complete intersection ring because the ideal $I\subset R$ is not $R$-regular. For example, $xy$ is a zero-divisor to $x$ in $R/(x^2,y^2)$.
