= Geometrically regular ring =

In algebraic geometry, a geometrically regular ring is a Noetherian ring over a field that remains a regular ring after any finite extension of the base field. Geometrically regular schemes are defined in a similar way. In older terminology, points with regular local rings were called simple points, and points with geometrically regular local rings were called absolutely simple points. Over fields that are of characteristic 0, or algebraically closed, or more generally perfect, geometrically regular rings are the same as regular rings. Geometric regularity originated when Claude Chevalley and André Weil pointed out to Oscar Zariski (1947) that, over non-perfect fields, the Jacobian criterion for a simple point of an algebraic variety is not equivalent to the condition that the local ring is regular.

A Noetherian local ring containing a field k is geometrically regular over k if and only if it is formally smooth over k.

== Examples ==
Zariski (1947) gave the following two examples of local rings that are regular but not geometrically regular.

1. Suppose that k is a field of characteristic p > 0 and a is an element of k that is not a pth power. Then every point of the curve x^{p} + y^{p} = a is regular. However over the field k[a^{1/p}], every point of the curve is singular. So the points of this curve are regular but not geometrically regular.
2. In the previous example, the equation defining the curve becomes reducible over a finite extension of the base field. This is not the real cause of the phenomenon: Chevalley pointed out to Zariski that the curve x^{p} + y^{2} = a (with the notation of the previous example) is absolutely irreducible but still has a point that is regular but not geometrically regular.

== See also ==
- Regular scheme
