= J-2 ring =

In commutative algebra, a J-0 ring is a ring $R$ such that the set of regular points, that is, points $p$ of the spectrum at which the localization $R_p$ is a regular local ring, contains a non-empty open subset, a J-1 ring is a ring such that the set of regular points is an open subset, and a J-2 ring is a ring such that any finitely generated algebra over the ring is a J-1 ring.

== Examples ==
Most rings that occur in algebraic geometry or number theory are J-2 rings, and in fact it is not trivial to construct any examples of rings that are not. In particular all excellent rings are J-2 rings; in fact this is part of the definition of an excellent ring.

All Dedekind domains of characteristic 0 and all local Noetherian rings of dimension at most 1 are J-2 rings. The family of J-2 rings is closed under taking localizations and finitely generated algebras.

For an example of a Noetherian domain that is not a J-0 ring, take R to be the subring of the polynomial ring k[x_{1},x_{2},...] in infinitely many generators generated by the squares and cubes of all generators, and form the ring S from R by adjoining inverses to all elements not in any of the ideals generated by some x_{n}. Then S is a 1-dimensional Noetherian domain that is not a J-0 ring. More precisely S has a cusp singularity at every closed point, so the set of non-singular points consists of just the ideal (0) and contains no nonempty open sets.

== See also ==
- Excellent ring
