= Gorenstein ring =

Local ring in commutative algebra

In commutative algebra, a Gorenstein local ring is a commutative Noetherian local ring R with finite injective dimension as an R-module. There are many equivalent conditions, some of them listed below, often saying that a Gorenstein ring is self-dual in some sense.

Gorenstein rings were introduced by Grothendieck in his 1961 seminar (published in (Hartshorne 1967)). The name comes from a duality property of singular plane curves studied by Gorenstein (1952) (who was fond of claiming that he did not understand the definition of a Gorenstein ring). The zero-dimensional case had been studied by Macaulay (1934), Serre (1961) and Bass (1963) publicized the concept of Gorenstein rings.

Frobenius rings are noncommutative analogs of zero-dimensional Gorenstein rings. Gorenstein schemes are the geometric version of Gorenstein rings.

For Noetherian local rings, there is the following chain of inclusions.

Universally catenary rings ⊃ Cohen–Macaulay rings ⊃ Gorenstein rings ⊃ complete intersection rings ⊃ regular local rings

== Definitions ==
A Gorenstein ring is a commutative Noetherian ring such that each localization at a prime ideal is a Gorenstein local ring, as defined below. A Gorenstein ring is in particular Cohen–Macaulay.

One elementary characterization is: a Noetherian local ring R of dimension zero (equivalently, with R of finite length as an R-module) is Gorenstein if and only if Hom_{R}(k, R) has dimension 1 as a k-vector space, where k is the residue field of R. Equivalently, R has simple socle as an R-module. More generally, a Noetherian local ring R is Gorenstein if and only if there is a regular sequence a_{1},...,a_{n} in the maximal ideal of R such that the quotient ring R/( a_{1},...,a_{n}) is Gorenstein of dimension zero.

For example, if R is a commutative graded algebra over a field k such that R has finite dimension as a k-vector space, R = k ⊕ R_{1} ⊕ ... ⊕ R_{m}, then R is Gorenstein if and only if it satisfies Poincaré duality, meaning that the top graded piece R_{m} has dimension 1 and the product R_{a} × R_{m−a} → R_{m} is a perfect pairing for every a.

Another interpretation of the Gorenstein property as a type of duality, for not necessarily graded rings, is: for a field F, a commutative F-algebra R of finite dimension as an F-vector space (hence of dimension zero as a ring) is Gorenstein if and only if there is an F-linear map e: R → F such that the symmetric bilinear form (x, y) := e(xy) on R (as an F-vector space) is nondegenerate.

For a commutative Noetherian local ring (R, m, k) of Krull dimension n, the following are equivalent:

- R has finite injective dimension as an R-module;
- R has injective dimension n as an R-module;
- The Ext group $\operatorname{Ext}^i_R(k,R) = 0$ for i ≠ n while $\operatorname{Ext}^n_R(k,R) \cong k;$
- $\operatorname{Ext}^i_R(k,R) = 0$ for some i > n;
- $\operatorname{Ext}^i_R(k,R) = 0$ for all i < n and $\operatorname{Ext}^n_R(k,R) \cong k;$
- R is an n-dimensional Gorenstein ring.

A (not necessarily commutative) ring R is called Gorenstein if R has finite injective dimension both as a left R-module and as a right R-module. If R is a local ring, R is said to be a local Gorenstein ring.

== Examples ==
- Every local complete intersection ring, in particular every regular local ring, is Gorenstein.
- The ring R = k[x,y,z]/(x^{2}, y^{2}, xz, yz, z^{2}−xy) is a 0-dimensional Gorenstein ring that is not a complete intersection ring. In more detail: a basis for R as a k-vector space is given by: $\{1,x,y,z,z^2\}.$ R is Gorenstein because the socle has dimension 1 as a k-vector space, spanned by z^{2}. Alternatively, one can observe that R satisfies Poincaré duality when it is viewed as a graded ring with x, y, z all of the same degree. Finally. R is not a complete intersection because it has 3 generators and a minimal set of 5 (not 3) relations.
- The ring R = k[x,y]/(x^{2}, y^{2}, xy) is a 0-dimensional Cohen–Macaulay ring that is not a Gorenstein ring. In more detail: a basis for R as a k-vector space is given by: $\{1,x,y\}.$ R is not Gorenstein because the socle has dimension 2 (not 1) as a k-vector space, spanned by x and y.

== Properties ==
- A Noetherian local ring is Gorenstein if and only if its completion is Gorenstein.
- The canonical module of a Gorenstein local ring R is isomorphic to R. In geometric terms, it follows that the standard dualizing complex of a Gorenstein scheme X over a field is simply a line bundle (viewed as a complex in degree −dim(X)); this line bundle is called the canonical bundle of X. Using the canonical bundle, Serre duality takes the same form for Gorenstein schemes as in the smooth case.

In the context of graded rings R, the canonical module of a Gorenstein ring R is isomorphic to R with some degree shift.

- For a Gorenstein local ring (R, m, k) of dimension n, Grothendieck local duality takes the following form. Let E(k) be the injective hull of the residue field k as an R-module. Then, for any finitely generated R-module M and integer i, the local cohomology group $H^i_m(M)$ is dual to $\operatorname{Ext}_R^{n-i}(M,R)$ in the sense that:

$$H_m^i(M) \cong \operatorname{Hom}_R(\operatorname{Ext}_R^{n-i}(M,R), E(k)).$$

- Stanley showed that for a finitely generated commutative graded algebra R over a field k such that R is an integral domain, the Gorenstein property depends only on the Cohen–Macaulay property together with the Hilbert series

$$f(t) = \sum\nolimits_j \dim_k(R_j)t^j.$$

Namely, a graded domain R is Gorenstein if and only if it is Cohen–Macaulay and the Hilbert series is symmetric in the sense that

$$f\left(\tfrac{1}{t} \right)=(-1)^n t^s f(t)$$

for some integer s, where n is the dimension of R.

- Let (R, m, k) be a Noetherian local ring of embedding codimension c, meaning that c = dim_{k}(m/m^{2}) − dim(R). In geometric terms, this holds for a local ring of a subscheme of codimension c in a regular scheme. For c at most 2, Serre showed that R is Gorenstein if and only if it is a complete intersection. There is also a structure theorem for Gorenstein rings of codimension 3 in terms of the Pfaffians of a skew-symmetric matrix, by Buchsbaum and Eisenbud. In 2011, Miles Reid extended this structure theorem to case of codimension 4.
