= Total ring of fractions =

Construction within abstract algebra

In abstract algebra, the total quotient ring or total ring of fractions is a construction that generalizes the notion of the field of fractions of an integral domain to commutative rings R that may have zero divisors. The construction embeds R in a larger ring, giving every non-zero-divisor of R an inverse in the larger ring. If the homomorphism from R to the new ring is to be injective, no further elements can be given an inverse.

== Definition ==
Let $R$ be a commutative ring and let $S$ be the set of elements that are not zero divisors in $R$; then $S$ is a multiplicatively closed set. Hence we may localize the ring $R$ at the set $S$ to obtain the total quotient ring $S^{-1}R=Q(R)$.

If $R$ is a domain, then $S = R-\{0\}$ and the total quotient ring is the same as the field of fractions. This justifies the notation $Q(R)$, which is sometimes used for the field of fractions as well, since there is no ambiguity in the case of a domain.

Since $S$ in the construction contains no zero divisors, the natural map $R \to Q(R)$ is injective, so the total quotient ring is an extension of $R$.

== Examples ==
- For a product ring A × B, the total quotient ring Q(A × B) is the product of total quotient rings Q(A) × Q(B). In particular, if A and B are integral domains, it is the product of quotient fields.
- For the ring of holomorphic functions on an open set D of complex numbers, the total quotient ring is the ring of meromorphic functions on D, even if D is not connected.
- In an Artinian ring, all elements are units or zero divisors. Hence the set of non-zero-divisors is the group of units of the ring, $R^{\times}$, and so $Q(R) = (R^{\times})^{-1}R$. But since all these elements already have inverses, $Q(R) = R$.
- In a commutative von Neumann regular ring R, the same thing happens. Suppose a in R is not a zero divisor. Then in a von Neumann regular ring a = axa for some x in R, giving the equation a(xa − 1) = 0. Since a is not a zero divisor, xa = 1, showing a is a unit. Here again, $Q(R) = R$.
- In algebraic geometry one considers a sheaf of total quotient rings on a scheme, and this may be used to give the definition of a Cartier divisor.

== The total ring of fractions of a reduced ring ==
Proposition—Let A be a reduced ring that has only finitely many minimal prime ideals, $\mathfrak{p}_1, \dots, \mathfrak{p}_r$ (e.g., a Noetherian reduced ring). Then

$$Q(A) \simeq \prod_{i=1}^r Q(A/\mathfrak{p}_i).$$

Geometrically, $\operatorname{Spec}(Q(A))$ is the Artinian scheme consisting (as a finite set) of the generic points of the irreducible components of $\operatorname{Spec} (A)$.

Proof: Every element of Q(A) is either a unit or a zero divisor. Thus, any proper ideal I of Q(A) is contained in the set of zero divisors of Q(A); that set equals the union of the minimal prime ideals $\mathfrak{p}_i Q(A)$ since Q(A) is reduced. By prime avoidance, I must be contained in some $\mathfrak{p}_i Q(A)$. Hence, the ideals $\mathfrak{p}_i Q(A)$ are maximal ideals of Q(A). Also, their intersection is zero. Thus, by the Chinese remainder theorem applied to Q(A),

$$Q(A) \simeq \prod_i Q(A)/\mathfrak{p}_i Q(A)$$.

Let S be the multiplicatively closed set of non-zero-divisors of A. By exactness of localization,

$$Q(A)/\mathfrak{p}_i Q(A) = A[S^{-1}] / \mathfrak{p}_i A[S^{-1}] = (A / \mathfrak{p}_i)[S^{-1}]$$,

which is already a field and so must be $Q(A/\mathfrak{p}_i)$. $\square$

== Generalization ==
If $R$ is a commutative ring and $S$ is any multiplicatively closed set in $R$, the localization $S^{-1}R$ can still be constructed, but the ring homomorphism from $R$ to $S^{-1}R$ might fail to be injective. For example, if $0 \in S$, then $S^{-1}R$ is the trivial ring.
