= Integrally closed domain =

Algebraic structure

In commutative algebra, an integrally closed domain A is an integral domain whose integral closure in its field of fractions is A itself. Spelled out, this means that if x is an element of the field of fractions of A that is a root of a monic polynomial with coefficients in A, then x is itself an element of A. Many well-studied domains are integrally closed, as shown by the following chain of class inclusions:

rngs ⊃ rings ⊃ commutative rings ⊃ integral domains ⊃ integrally closed domains ⊃ GCD domains ⊃ unique factorization domains ⊃ principal ideal domains ⊃ Euclidean domains ⊃ fields ⊃ algebraically closed fields

An explicit example is the ring of integers Z, a Euclidean domain. All regular local rings are integrally closed as well.

A ring whose localizations at all prime ideals are integrally closed domains is a normal ring.

== Basic properties ==
Let A be an integrally closed domain with field of fractions K and let L be a field extension of K. Then x∈L is integral over A if and only if it is algebraic over K and its minimal polynomial over K has coefficients in A. In particular, this means that any element of L integral over A is root of a monic polynomial in A[X] that is irreducible in K[X].

If A is a domain contained in a field K, we can consider the integral closure of A in K (i.e. the set of all elements of K that are integral over A). This integral closure is an integrally closed domain.

Integrally closed domains also play a role in the hypothesis of the Going-down theorem. The theorem states that if A⊆B is an integral extension of domains and A is an integrally closed domain, then the going-down property holds for the extension A⊆B.

== Examples ==
The following are integrally closed domains.

- A principal ideal domain (in particular: the integers and any field).
- A unique factorization domain (in particular, any polynomial ring over a field, over the integers, or over any unique factorization domain).
- A GCD domain (in particular, any Bézout domain or valuation domain).
- A Dedekind domain (in particular, any ring of integers of a number field).
- A symmetric algebra over a field (since every symmetric algebra is isomorphic to a polynomial ring in several variables over a field).
- Let $k$ be a field of characteristic not 2 and $S = k[x_1, \dots, x_n]$ a polynomial ring over it. If $f$ is a square-free nonconstant polynomial in $S$, then $S[y]/(y^2 - f)$ is an integrally closed domain. In particular, $k[x_0, \dots, x_r]/(x_0^2 + \dots + x_r^2)$ is an integrally closed domain if $r \ge 2$.

To give a non-example, let k be a field and $A = k[t^2, t^3] \subset k[t]$, the subalgebra generated by t^{2} and t^{3}. Then A is not integrally closed: it has the field of fractions $k(t)$, and the monic polynomial $X^2 - t^2$ in the variable X has root t which is in the field of fractions but not in A. This is related to the fact that the plane curve $Y^2 = X^3$ has a singularity at the origin.

Another domain that is not integrally closed is $A = \mathbb{Z}[\sqrt{5}\,]$; its field of fractions contains the element $\frac{\sqrt{5}+1}{2}$, which is not in A but satisfies the monic polynomial $X^2-X-1 = 0$.

== Noetherian integrally closed domain ==
For a noetherian local domain A of dimension one, the following are equivalent.

- A is integrally closed.
- The maximal ideal of A is principal.
- A is a discrete valuation ring (equivalently A is Dedekind.)
- A is a regular local ring.

Let A be a noetherian integral domain. Then A is integrally closed if and only if (i) A is the intersection of all localizations $A_\mathfrak{p}$ over prime ideals $\mathfrak{p}$ of height 1 and (ii) the localization $A_\mathfrak{p}$ at a prime ideal $\mathfrak{p}$ of height 1 is a discrete valuation ring.

A noetherian ring is a Krull domain if and only if it is an integrally closed domain.

In the non-noetherian setting, one has the following: an integral domain is integrally closed if and only if it is the intersection of all valuation rings containing it.

== Normal rings ==
Authors including Serre, Grothendieck, and Matsumura define a normal ring to be a ring whose localizations at prime ideals are integrally closed domains. Such a ring is necessarily a reduced ring, and this is sometimes included in the definition. In general, if A is a Noetherian ring whose localizations at maximal ideals are all domains, then A is a finite product of domains. In particular, if A is a Noetherian and normal ring, then the domains in the product are integrally closed domains. Conversely, any finite product of integrally closed domains is normal. In particular, if $\operatorname{Spec}(A)$ is Noetherian, normal, and connected, then A is an integrally closed domain. (Cf. smooth variety.)

Let A be a noetherian ring. Then (Serre's criterion) A is normal if and only if it satisfies the following: for any prime ideal $\mathfrak{p}$,

1. If $\mathfrak{p}$ has height $\le 1$, then $A_\mathfrak{p}$ is regular (i.e., $A_\mathfrak{p}$ is a discrete valuation ring.)
2. If $\mathfrak{p}$ has height $\ge 2$, then $A_\mathfrak{p}$ has depth $\ge 2$.

Item (i) is often phrased as "regular in codimension 1". Note that (i) implies that the set of associated primes $Ass(A)$ has no embedded primes, and, when (i) is the case, (ii) means that $Ass(A/fA)$ has no embedded prime for any non-zerodivisor f. In particular, a Cohen-Macaulay ring satisfies (ii). Geometrically, we have the following: if X is a local complete intersection in a nonsingular variety; e.g., X itself is nonsingular, then X is Cohen-Macaulay; i.e., the stalks $\mathcal{O}_p$ of the structure sheaf are Cohen-Macaulay for all prime ideals p. Then we can say: X is normal (i.e., the stalks of its structure sheaf are all normal) if and only if it is regular in codimension 1.

== Completely integrally closed domains ==
Let A be a domain and K its field of fractions. An element x in K is said to be almost integral over A if the subring A[x] of K generated by A and x is a fractional ideal of A; that is, if there is a nonzero $d \in A$ such that $d x^n \in A$ for all $n \ge 0$. Then A is said to be completely integrally closed if every almost integral element of K is contained in A. A completely integrally closed domain is integrally closed. Conversely, a noetherian integrally closed domain is completely integrally closed.

Assume A is completely integrally closed. Then the formal power series ring $A[[X]]$ is completely integrally closed. This is significant since the analog is false for an integrally closed domain: let R be a valuation domain of height at least 2 (which is integrally closed). Then $R[[X]]$ is not integrally closed. Let L be a field extension of K. Then the integral closure of A in L is completely integrally closed.

An integral domain is completely integrally closed if and only if the monoid of divisors of A is a group.

== "Integrally closed" under constructions ==
The following conditions are equivalent for an integral domain A:

1. A is integrally closed;
2. A_{p} (the localization of A with respect to p) is integrally closed for every prime ideal p;
3. A_{m} is integrally closed for every maximal ideal m.

1 → 2 results immediately from the preservation of integral closure under localization; 2 → 3 is trivial; 3 → 1 results from the preservation of integral closure under localization, the exactness of localization, and the property that an A-module M is zero if and only if its localization with respect to every maximal ideal is zero.

In contrast, the "integrally closed" does not pass over quotient, for Z[t]/(t^{2}+4) is not integrally closed.

The localization of a completely integrally closed domain need not be completely integrally closed.

A direct limit of integrally closed domains is an integrally closed domain.

== Modules over an integrally closed domain ==
Let A be a Noetherian integrally closed domain.

An ideal I of A is divisorial if and only if every associated prime of A/I has height one.

Let P denote the set of all prime ideals in A of height one. If T is a finitely generated torsion module, one puts:

$$\chi(T) = \sum_{p \in P} \operatorname{length}_p(T) p$$,

which makes sense as a formal sum; i.e., a divisor. We write $c(d)$ for the divisor class of d. If $F, F'$ are maximal submodules of M, then $c(\chi(M/F)) = c(\chi(M/F'))$ and $c(\chi(M/F))$ is denoted (in Bourbaki) by $c(M)$.

== See also ==
- Unibranch local ring
