= Reduced ring =

Ring without non-zero nilpotent elements

In ring theory, a branch of mathematics, a ring is called a reduced ring if it has no non-zero nilpotent elements. Equivalently, a ring is reduced if it has no non-zero elements with square zero, that is, x^{2} = 0 implies x = 0. A commutative algebra over a commutative ring is called a reduced algebra if its underlying ring is reduced.

== Properties ==
The nilpotent elements of a commutative ring R form an ideal of R, called the nilradical of R; therefore a commutative ring is reduced if and only if its nilradical is zero. Moreover, a commutative ring is reduced if and only if the only element contained in all prime ideals is zero.

A quotient ring R/I is reduced if and only if I is a radical ideal.

Let $\mathfrak{N}_R$ denote the nilradical of a commutative ring $R$. There is a functor $R \mapsto R/\mathfrak{N}_R$ of the category of commutative rings $\textsf{CRing}$ into the category of reduced rings $\textsf{Red}$ and it is left adjoint to the inclusion functor $I$ of $\textsf{Red}$ into $\textsf{CRing}$, making $\textsf{Red}$ a reflective subcategory of $\textsf{CRing}$. The natural bijection $\text{Hom}_{\textsf{Red}}(R/\mathfrak{N}_R,S)\cong\text{Hom}_{\textsf{CRing}}(R,I(S))$ is induced from the universal property of quotient rings.

Let D be the set of all zero-divisors in a reduced ring R. Then D is the union of all minimal prime ideals.

Over a Noetherian ring R, we say a finitely generated module M has locally constant rank if $\mathfrak{p} \mapsto \operatorname{dim}_{k(\mathfrak{p})}(M \otimes k(\mathfrak{p}))$ is a locally constant (or equivalently continuous) function on Spec R. Then R is reduced if and only if every finitely generated module of locally constant rank is projective.

== Examples and non-examples ==
- Subrings, products, and localizations of reduced rings are again reduced rings.
- The ring of integers Z is a reduced ring. Every field and every polynomial ring over a field (in arbitrarily many variables) is a reduced ring.
- More generally, every integral domain is a reduced ring since a nilpotent element is a fortiori a zero-divisor. On the other hand, not every reduced ring is an integral domain; for example, the ring Z[x, y]/(xy) contains x + (xy) and y + (xy) as zero-divisors, but no non-zero nilpotent elements. As another example, the ring Z × Z contains (1, 0) and (0, 1) as zero-divisors, but contains no non-zero nilpotent elements.
- The ring Z/6Z is reduced, however Z/4Z is not reduced: the class 2 + 4Z is nilpotent. In general, Z/nZ is reduced if and only if n = 0 or n is square-free.
- If R is a commutative ring and N is its nilradical, then the quotient ring R/N is reduced.
- A commutative ring R of prime characteristic p is reduced if and only if its Frobenius endomorphism is injective (cf. Perfect field.)

== Generalizations ==
Reduced rings play an elementary role in algebraic geometry, where this concept is generalized to the notion of a reduced scheme.

== See also ==
- Total quotient ring § The total ring of fractions of a reduced ring
