= Subring =

Subset of a ring that forms a ring itself

In mathematics, a subring of a ring R is a subset of R that is itself a ring when binary operations of addition and multiplication on R are restricted to the subset, and that shares the same multiplicative identity as R. (Note: In general, not all subsets of a ring R are rings.)

== Definition ==
A subring of a ring (R, +, *, 0, 1) is a subset S of R that preserves the structure of the ring, i.e. a ring (S, +, *, 0, 1) with S ⊆ R. Equivalently, it is both a subgroup of (R, +, 0) and a submonoid of (R, *, 1).

Equivalently, S is a subring if and only if it contains the multiplicative identity of R, and is closed under multiplication and subtraction. This is sometimes known as the subring test.

=== Variations ===
Some mathematicians define rings without requiring the existence of a multiplicative identity (see Ring (mathematics) § History). In this case, a subring of R is a subset of R that is a ring for the operations of R (this does imply it contains the additive identity of R). This alternate definition gives a strictly weaker condition, even for rings that do have a multiplicative identity, in that all ideals become subrings, and they may have a multiplicative identity that differs from the one of R. With the definition requiring a multiplicative identity, which is used in the rest of this article, the only ideal of R that is a subring of R is R itself.

== Examples ==
- The ring of integers $\Z$ is a subring of both the field of real numbers and the polynomial ring $\Z[X]$.
- $\mathbb{Z}$ and its quotients $\mathbb{Z}/n\mathbb{Z}$ have no subrings (with multiplicative identity) other than the full ring.
- Every ring has a unique smallest subring, isomorphic to some ring $\mathbb{Z}/n\mathbb{Z}$ with n a nonnegative integer (see Characteristic). The integers $\mathbb{Z}$ correspond to n = 0 in this statement, since $\mathbb{Z}$ is isomorphic to $\mathbb{Z}/0\mathbb{Z}$.
- The center of a ring R is a subring of R, and R is an associative algebra over its center.

== Subring generated by a set ==
A special kind of subring of a ring R is the subring generated by a subset X, which is defined as the intersection of all subrings of R containing X. The subring generated by X is also the set of all linear combinations with integer coefficients of products of elements of X, including the additive identity ("empty combination") and multiplicative identity ("empty product").

Any intersection of subrings of R is itself a subring of R; therefore, the subring generated by X (denoted here as S) is indeed a subring of R. This subring S is the smallest subring of R containing X; that is, if T is any other subring of R containing X, then S ⊆ T.

Since R itself is a subring of R, if R is generated by X, it is said that the ring R is generated by X.

== Ring extension ==
Subrings generalize some aspects of field extensions. If S is a subring of a ring R, then equivalently R is said to be a ring extension (Note: Not to be confused with the ring-theoretic analog of a group extension.) of S.

=== Adjoining ===
If A is a ring and T is a subring of A generated by R ∪ S, where R is a subring, then T is a ring extension and is said to be S adjoined to R, denoted R[S]. Individual elements can also be adjoined to a subring, denoted R[a_{1}, a_{2}, ..., a_{n}].

For example, the ring of Gaussian integers $\Z[i]$ is a subring of $\C$ generated by $\Z \cup \{i\}$, and thus is the adjunction of the imaginary unit i to $\Z$.

=== Prime subring ===
The intersection of all subrings of a ring R is a subring that may be called the prime subring of R by analogy with prime fields.

The prime subring of a ring R is a subring of the center of R, which is isomorphic either to the ring $\Z$ of the integers or to the ring of the integers modulo n, where n is the smallest positive integer such that the sum of n copies of 1 equals 0.

== See also ==
- Integral extension
- Group extension
- Algebraic extension
- Ore extension
