= Degree of a field extension =

Dimension of the extension field viewed as a vector space over the base field

In mathematics, more specifically field theory, the degree of a field extension is a rough measure of the "size" of the field extension. The concept plays an important role in many parts of mathematics, including algebra and number theory—indeed in any area where fields appear prominently.

== Definition and notation ==
Suppose that E/F is a field extension. Then E may be considered as a vector space over F (the field of scalars). The dimension of this vector space is called the degree of the field extension, and it is denoted by [E:F].

The degree may be finite or infinite, the field being called a finite extension or infinite extension accordingly. An extension E/F is also sometimes said to be simply finite if it is a finite extension; this should not be confused with the fields themselves being finite fields (fields with finitely many elements).

The degree should not be confused with the transcendence degree of a field; for example, the field Q(X) of rational functions has infinite degree over Q, but transcendence degree only equal to 1.

== The multiplicativity formula for degrees ==
Given three fields arranged in a tower, say K a subfield of L which is in turn a subfield of M, there is a simple relation between the degrees of the three extensions L/K, M/L and M/K:

$$[M:K] = [M:L] \cdot [L:K].$$

In other words, the degree going from the "bottom" to the "top" field is just the product of the degrees going from the "bottom" to the "middle" and then from the "middle" to the "top". It is quite analogous to Lagrange's theorem in group theory, which relates the order of a group to the order and index of a subgroup — indeed Galois theory shows that this analogy is more than just a coincidence.

The formula holds for both finite and infinite degree extensions. In the infinite case, the product is interpreted in the sense of products of cardinal numbers. In particular, this means that if M/K is finite, then both M/L and L/K are finite.

If M/K is finite, then the formula imposes strong restrictions on the kinds of fields that can occur between M and K, via simple arithmetical considerations. For example, if the degree [M:K] is a prime number p, then for any intermediate field L, one of two things can happen: either [M:L] = p and [L:K] = 1, in which case L is equal to K, or [M:L] = 1 and [L:K] = p, in which case L is equal to M. Therefore, there are no intermediate fields (apart from M and K themselves).

=== Proof of the multiplicativity formula in the finite case ===
Suppose that K, L and M form a tower of fields as in the degree formula above, and that both d = [L:K] and e = [M:L] are finite. This means that we may select a basis {u_{1}, ..., u_{d}} for L over K, and a basis {w_{1}, ..., w_{e}} for M over L. We will show that the elements u_{m}w_{n}, for m ranging through 1, 2, ..., d and n ranging through 1, 2, ..., e, form a basis for M/K; since there are precisely de of them, this proves that the dimension of M/K is de, which is the desired result.

First we check that they span M/K. If x is any element of M, then since the w_{n} form a basis for M over L, we can find elements a_{n} in L such that

$$x = \sum_{n=1}^e a_n w_n = a_1 w_1 + \cdots + a_e w_e.$$

Then, since the u_{m} form a basis for L over K, we can find elements b_{m,n} in K such that for each n,

$$a_n = \sum_{m=1}^d b_{m,n} u_m = b_{1,n} u_1 + \cdots + b_{d,n} u_d.$$

Then using the distributive law and associativity of multiplication in M we have

$$x = \sum_{n=1}^e \left(\sum_{m=1}^d b_{m,n} u_m\right) w_n = \sum_{n=1}^e \sum_{m=1}^d b_{m,n} (u_m w_n),$$

which shows that x is a linear combination of the u_{m}w_{n} with coefficients from K; in other words they span M over K.

Secondly we must check that they are linearly independent over K. So assume that

$$0 = \sum_{n=1}^e \sum_{m=1}^d b_{m,n} (u_m w_n)$$

for some coefficients b_{m,n} in K. Using distributivity and associativity again, we can group the terms as

$$0 = \sum_{n=1}^e \left(\sum_{m=1}^d b_{m,n} u_m\right) w_n,$$

and we see that the terms in parentheses must be zero, because they are elements of L, and the w_{n} are linearly independent over L. That is,

$$0 = \sum_{m=1}^d b_{m,n} u_m$$

for each n. Then, since the b_{m,n} coefficients are in K, and the u_{m} are linearly independent over K, we must have that b_{m,n} = 0 for all m and all n. This shows that the elements u_{m}w_{n} are linearly independent over K. This concludes the proof.

=== Proof of the formula in the infinite case ===
In this case, we start with bases u_{α} and w_{β} of L/K and M/L respectively, where α is taken from an indexing set A, and β from an indexing set B. Using an entirely similar argument as the one above, we find that the products u_{α}w_{β} form a basis for M/K. These are indexed by the Cartesian product A × B, which by definition has cardinality equal to the product of the cardinalities of A and B.

== Examples ==
- The complex numbers are a field extension over the real numbers with degree [C:R] = 2, and thus there are no non-trivial fields between them.
- The field extension Q(√2, √3), obtained by adjoining √2 and √3 to the field Q of rational numbers, has degree 4, that is, [Q(√2, √3):Q] = 4. The intermediate field Q(√2) has degree 2 over Q; we conclude from the multiplicativity formula that [Q(√2, √3):Q(√2)] = 4/2 = 2.
- The finite field (or Galois field) GF(125) = GF(5^{3}) has degree 3 over its subfield GF(5). More generally, if p is a prime and n, m are positive integers with n dividing m, then [GF(p^{m}):GF(p^{n})] = m/n.
- The field extension C(T)/C, where C(T) is the field of rational functions over C, has infinite degree (indeed it is a purely transcendental extension). This can be seen by observing that the elements 1, T, T^{2}, etc., are linearly independent over C.
- The field extension C(T^{2}) also has infinite degree over C. However, if we view C(T^{2}) as a subfield of C(T), then in fact [C(T):C(T^{2})] = 2. More generally, if X and Y are algebraic curves over a field K, and F : X → Y is a surjective morphism between them of degree d, then the function fields K(X) and K(Y) are both of infinite degree over K, but the degree [K(X):K(Y)] turns out to be equal to d.

== Generalization ==
Given two division rings E and F with F contained in E and the multiplication and addition of F being the restriction of the operations in E, we can consider E as a vector space over F in two ways: having the scalars act on the left, giving a dimension [E:F]_{l}, and having them act on the right, giving a dimension [E:F]_{r}. The two dimensions need not agree. Both dimensions however satisfy a multiplication formula for towers of division rings; the proof above applies to left-acting scalars without change.
