= Regular local ring =

Type of ring in commutative algebra

In commutative algebra, a regular local ring is a Noetherian local ring having the property that the minimal number of generators of its maximal ideal is equal to its Krull dimension. In symbols, let $A$ be any Noetherian local ring with unique maximal ideal $\mathfrak{m}$, and suppose $a_1,\cdots,a_n$ is a minimal set of generators of $\mathfrak{m}$. Then Krull's principal ideal theorem implies that $n\geq\dim A$, and $A$ is regular whenever $n=\dim A$.

The concept is motivated by its geometric meaning. A point $x$ on an algebraic variety $X$ is nonsingular (a smooth point) if and only if the local ring $\mathcal{O}_{X, x}$ of germs at $x$ is regular. (See also: regular scheme.) Regular local rings are not related to von Neumann regular rings. (Note: A local von Neumann regular ring is a division ring, so the two conditions are not very compatible.)

For Noetherian local rings, there is the following chain of inclusions:

Universally catenary rings ⊃ Cohen–Macaulay rings ⊃ Gorenstein rings ⊃ complete intersection rings ⊃ regular local rings

== Characterizations ==
There are a number of useful definitions of a regular local ring, one of which is mentioned above. If $A$ is a Noetherian local ring with maximal ideal $\mathfrak{m}$, then the following are equivalent definitions. $A$ is regular whenever:

- Its Krull dimension is equal to the minimal number of generators of its maximal ideal; that is when $\mathfrak{m} = (a_1, \ldots, a_n)$, where $n$ is chosen as small as possible, and

$$\dim A = n\,$$.

The generators $\{a_1, \ldots, a_n\}$ are then called a regular system of parameters.

- The dimension of its Zariski tangent space is equal to its Krull dimension; that is, when $k = A / \mathfrak{m}$ is the residue field of $A$, and

$$\dim_k \mathfrak{m} / \mathfrak{m}^2 = \dim A\,$$.

- Its global dimension is finite; that is, when $\mbox{gl dim } A := \sup \{ \operatorname{pd} M \mid M \text{ is an }A\text{-module} \}$ is the supremum of the projective dimensions of all $A$-modules, and

$$\mbox{gl dim } A < \infty\,$$,

in which case, $\mbox{gl dim } A = \dim A$.

- Its completion $\widehat A$ is the ring of formal power series: that is, when $k = A / \mathfrak{m}$, $d=\dim A$, and $\hat A \cong k[[X_1,\ldots, X_d]]$ for formal variables $X_i$.

Multiplicity one criterion states: $A$ is regular if (i) the completion $\widehat A$ is unimixed, meaning no embedded prime divisor of the zero ideal, and $\dim \widehat{A}/\mathfrak p = \dim \widehat{A}$ for each minimal prime $\mathfrak p$; and (ii) the multiplicity of A is one, meaning the leading coefficient of its Hilbert-Samuel polynomial is $\tfrac{1}{d!}$ for $d=\dim A$. (The converse of (ii) is always true: the multiplicity of a regular local ring is one.) This criterion corresponds to the geometric intuition in algebraic geometry that a local ring of an intersection is regular if and only if the intersection is a transversal intersection.

If $A$ has positive characteristic, there is the following important result of Kunz, related to Frobenius splitting: A Noetherian local ring $A$ of positive characteristic p is regular if and only if the Frobenius morphism $A \to A, a \mapsto a^p$ is flat, and $A$ is reduced, meaning no non-zero nilpotent elements. No similar result is known in characteristic zero, which lacks an analog of the Frobenius morphism.

== Examples ==
1. Every field is a regular local ring. These have (Krull) dimension 0. In fact, the fields are exactly the regular local rings of dimension 0.
2. Any discrete valuation ring is a regular local ring of dimension 1 and the regular local rings of dimension 1 are exactly the discrete valuation rings. For example, if k is a field and X is an indeterminate, then the ring of formal power series k[[X]] is a regular local ring having (Krull) dimension 1.
3. If p is an ordinary prime number, the ring of p-adic integers is an example of a discrete valuation ring, and consequently a regular local ring. In contrast to the example above, this ring does not contain a field.
4. More generally, if k is a field and X_{1}, X_{2}, ..., X_{d} are indeterminates, then the ring of formal power series k[[X_{1}, X_{2}, ..., X_{d}]] is a regular local ring having (Krull) dimension d.
5. Still more generally, if A is a regular local ring, then the formal power series ring A[[x]] is regular local.
6. If Z is the ring of integers and X is an indeterminate, the ring Z[X]_{(2, X)} (i.e. the ring Z[X] localized in the prime ideal (2, X) ) is an example of a 2-dimensional regular local ring which does not contain a field.
7. By the structure theorem of Irvin Cohen, a complete regular local ring of Krull dimension d that contains a field k is a power series ring in d variables over an extension field of k.

== Non-examples ==
The ring $A=k[x]/(x^2)$ is not a regular local ring since it is finite dimensional but does not have finite global dimension. For example, there is an infinite resolution

$$\cdots \xrightarrow{\cdot x} \frac{k[x]}{(x^2)} \xrightarrow{\cdot x} \frac{k[x]}{(x^2)} \to k \to 0$$

Using another one of the characterizations, $A$ has exactly one prime ideal $\mathfrak{m}=\frac{(x)}{(x^2)}$, so the ring has Krull dimension $0$, but $\mathfrak{m}^2$ is the zero ideal, so $\mathfrak{m}/\mathfrak{m}^2$ has $k$ dimension at least $1$. (In fact it is equal to $1$ since $x + \mathfrak{m}$ is a basis.)

== Basic properties ==
The Auslander–Buchsbaum theorem states that every regular local ring is a unique factorization domain.

Every localization, as well as the completion, of a regular local ring is regular.

If $(A, \mathfrak{m})$ is a complete regular local ring that contains a field, then

$$A \cong k[[x_1, \ldots, x_d]]$$,

where $k = A / \mathfrak{m}$ is the residue field, and $d = \dim A$, the Krull dimension.

See also: Serre's inequality on height and Serre's multiplicity conjectures.

== Origin of basic notions ==
Regular local rings were originally defined by Wolfgang Krull in 1937, but they first became prominent in the work of Oscar Zariski a few years later, who showed that geometrically, a regular local ring corresponds to a smooth point on an algebraic variety. Let Y be an algebraic variety contained in affine n-space over a perfect field, and suppose that Y is the vanishing locus of the polynomials f_{1},...,f_{m}. Y is nonsingular at P if Y satisfies a Jacobian condition: If M = (∂f_{i}/∂x_{j}) is the matrix of partial derivatives of the defining equations of the variety, then the rank of the matrix found by evaluating M at P is n − dim Y. Zariski proved that Y is nonsingular at P if and only if the local ring of Y at P is regular. (Zariski observed that this can fail over non-perfect fields.) This implies that smoothness is an intrinsic property of the variety, in other words it does not depend on where or how the variety is embedded in affine space. It also suggests that regular local rings should have good properties, but before the introduction of techniques from homological algebra very little was known in this direction. Once such techniques were introduced in the 1950s, Auslander and Buchsbaum proved that every regular local ring is a unique factorization domain.

Another property suggested by geometric intuition is that the localization of a regular local ring should again be regular. Again, this lay unsolved until the introduction of homological techniques. It was Jean-Pierre Serre who found a homological characterization of regular local rings: A local ring A is regular if and only if A has finite global dimension, i.e. if every A-module has a projective resolution of finite length. It is easy to show that the property of having finite global dimension is preserved under localization, and consequently that localizations of regular local rings at prime ideals are again regular.

This justifies the definition of regularity for non-local commutative rings given in the next section.

== Regular ring ==
In commutative algebra, a regular ring is a commutative Noetherian ring, such that the localization at every prime ideal is a regular local ring: that is, every such localization has the property that the minimal number of generators of its maximal ideal is equal to its Krull dimension.

The origin of the term regular ring lies in the fact that an affine variety is nonsingular (that is every point is regular) if and only if its ring of regular functions is regular.

For regular rings, Krull dimension agrees with global homological dimension.

Jean-Pierre Serre defined a regular ring as a commutative noetherian ring of finite global homological dimension. His definition is stronger than the definition above, which allows regular rings of infinite Krull dimension.

Examples of regular rings include fields (of dimension zero) and Dedekind domains. If A is regular then so is A[X], with dimension one greater than that of A.

In particular if k is a field, the ring of integers, or a principal ideal domain, then the polynomial ring $k[X_1, \ldots,X_n]$ is regular. In the case of a field, this is Hilbert's syzygy theorem.

Any localization of a regular ring is regular as well.

A regular ring is reduced (Note: since a ring is reduced if and only if its localizations at prime ideals are.) but need not be an integral domain. For example, the product of two regular integral domains is regular, but not an integral domain.

== See also ==
- Geometrically regular ring
- quasi-free ring
