= Dimension theory (algebra) =

Study of dimension in algebraic geometry

In mathematics, dimension theory is the study in terms of commutative algebra of the notion of dimension of an algebraic variety (and by extension that of a scheme). The need of a theory for such an apparently simple notion results from the existence of many definitions of dimension that are equivalent only in the most regular cases (see Dimension of an algebraic variety). A large part of dimension theory consists in studying the conditions under which several dimensions are equal, and many important classes of commutative rings may be defined as the rings such that two dimensions are equal; for example, a regular ring is a commutative ring such that the homological dimension is equal to the Krull dimension.

The theory is simpler for commutative rings that are finitely generated algebras over a field, which are also quotient rings of polynomial rings in a finite number of indeterminates over a field. In this case, which is the algebraic counterpart of the case of affine algebraic sets, most of the definitions of the dimension are equivalent. For general commutative rings, the lack of geometric interpretation is an obstacle to the development of the theory; in particular, very little is known for non-Noetherian rings. (Kaplansky's Commutative rings gives a good account of the non-Noetherian case.)

Throughout the article, $\dim$ denotes Krull dimension of a ring and $\operatorname{ht}$ the height of a prime ideal (i.e., the Krull dimension of the localization at that prime ideal). Rings are assumed to be commutative except in the last section on dimensions of non-commutative rings.

== Basic results ==
Let $R$ be a Noetherian ring or a valuation ring. Then
$$\dim R[x] = \dim R + 1.$$
If $R$ is noetherian, this follows from the fundamental theorem below (in particular, Krull's principal ideal theorem), but it is also a consequence of a more precise result. For any prime ideal $\mathfrak{p}$ in $R$,
$$\operatorname{ht}(\mathfrak{p} R[x]) = \operatorname{ht}(\mathfrak{p}).$$
$$\operatorname{ht}(\mathfrak{q}) = \operatorname{ht}(\mathfrak{p}) + 1$$
for any prime ideal $\mathfrak{q} \supsetneq \mathfrak{p} R[x]$ in $R[x]$ that contracts to $\mathfrak{p}$. This can be shown within basic ring theory (cf. Kaplansky, commutative rings). In addition, in each fiber of $\operatorname{Spec} R[x] \to \operatorname{Spec} R$, one cannot have a chain of primes ideals of length $\ge 2$.

Since an Artinian ring (e.g., a field) has dimension zero, by induction one gets a formula: for an artinian ring $R$,
$$\dim R[x_1, \dots, x_n] = n.$$

== Local rings ==
=== Fundamental theorem ===
Let $(R, \mathfrak{m})$ be a Noetherian local ring and $I$ a $\mathfrak{m}$-primary ideal (i.e., it sits between some power of $\mathfrak{m}$ and $\mathfrak{m}$). Let $F(t)$ be the Poincaré series of the associated graded ring $\operatorname{gr}_I R = \bigoplus_0^\infty I^n / I^{n+1}$. That is,
$$F(t) = \sum_0^\infty \ell(I^n / I^{n+1}) t^n$$
where $\ell$ refers to the length of a module (over an Artinian ring $(\operatorname{gr}_I R)_0 = R/I$). If $x_1, \dots, x_s$ generate $I$, then their image in $I/I^2$ have degree 1 and generate $\operatorname{gr}_I R$ as $R/I$-algebra. By the Hilbert–Serre theorem, $F$ is a rational function with exactly one pole at $t=1$ of order $d \le s$. Since
$$(1-t)^{-d} = \sum_0^\infty \binom{d-1+j}{d-1} t^j,$$
we find that the coefficient of $t^n$ in $F(t) = (1-t)^d F(t) (1 - t)^{-d}$ is of the form
$$\sum_0^N a_k \binom{d-1+n - k}{d-1} = (1 - t)^d F(t)\big|_{t=1} {n^{d-1} \over {d-1}!} + O(n^{d-2}).$$
That is to say, $\ell(I^n / I^{n+1})$ is a polynomial $P$ in $n$ of degree $d - 1$. $P$ is called the Hilbert polynomial of $\operatorname{gr}_I R$.

We set $d(R) = d$. We also set $\delta(R)$ to be the minimum number of elements of $R$ that can generate an $\mathfrak{m}$-primary ideal of $R$. Our ambition is to prove the fundamental theorem:
$$\delta(R) = d(R) = \dim R.$$
Since we can take $s$ to be $\delta(R)$, we already have $\delta(R) \ge d(R)$ from the above. Next we prove $d(R) \ge \dim R$ by induction on $d(R)$. Let $\mathfrak{p}_0 \subsetneq \cdots \subsetneq \mathfrak{p}_m$ be a chain of prime ideals in $R$. Let $D = R/\mathfrak{p}_0$ and $x$ a nonzero nonunit element in $D$. Since $x$ is not a zero-divisor, we have the exact sequence
$$0 \to D \overset{x}\to D \to D/xD \to 0.$$
The degree bound of the Hilbert-Samuel polynomial now implies that $d(D) > d(D/xD) \ge d(R/\mathfrak{p}_1)$. (This essentially follows from the Artin–Rees lemma; see Hilbert–Samuel function for the statement and the proof.) In $R/\mathfrak{p}_1$, the chain $\mathfrak{p}_i$ becomes a chain of length $m - 1$ and so, by inductive hypothesis and again by the degree estimate,
$$m-1 \le \dim (R/\mathfrak{p}_1) \le d(R/\mathfrak{p}_1) \le d(D) - 1 \le d(R) - 1.$$
The claim follows. It now remains to show $\dim R \ge \delta(R).$ More precisely, we shall show:

Lemma—The maximal ideal $\mathfrak{m}$ contains elements $x_1, \dots, x_d$, $d$ = Krull dimension of $R$, such that, for any $i$, any prime ideal containing $(x_1, \dots, x_i)$ has height $\ge i$.

(Notice: $(x_1, \dots, x_d)$ is then $\mathfrak{m}$-primary.) The proof is omitted. It appears, for example, in Atiyah–MacDonald. But it can also be supplied privately; the idea is to use prime avoidance.

=== Consequences of the fundamental theorem ===
Let $(R, \mathfrak{m})$ be a noetherian local ring and put $k = R/\mathfrak{m}$. Then

- $\dim R \le \dim_k \mathfrak{m}/\mathfrak{m}^2$, since a basis of $\mathfrak{m}/\mathfrak{m}^2$ lifts to a generating set of $\mathfrak{m}$ by Nakayama. If the equality holds, then $R$ is called a regular local ring.
- $\dim \widehat{R} = \dim R$, since $\operatorname{gr}R = \operatorname{gr}\widehat{R}$.
- (Krull's principal ideal theorem) The height of the ideal generated by elements $x_1, \dots, x_s$ in a Noetherian ring is at most $s$. Conversely, a prime ideal of height $s$ is minimal over an ideal generated by $s$ elements. (Proof: Let $\mathfrak{p}$ be a prime ideal minimal over such an ideal. Then $s \ge \dim R_\mathfrak{p} = \operatorname{ht} \mathfrak{p}$. The converse was shown in the course of the proof of the fundamental theorem.)

Theorem—If $A \to B$ is a morphism of noetherian local rings, then
$$\dim B/\mathfrak{m}_A B \ge \dim B - \dim A.$$
The equality holds if $A \to B$ is flat or more generally if it has the going-down property.

Proof: Let $x_1, \dots, x_n$ generate a $\mathfrak{m}_A$-primary ideal and $y_1, \dots, y_m$ be such that their images generate a $\mathfrak{m}_B/\mathfrak{m}_A B$-primary ideal. Then ${\mathfrak{m}_B}^s \subset (y_1, \dots, y_m) + \mathfrak{m}_A B$ for some $s$. Raising both sides to higher powers, we see some power of $\mathfrak{m}_B$ is contained in $(y_1, \dots, y_m, x_1, \dots, x_n)$; i.e., the latter ideal is $\mathfrak{m}_B$-primary; thus, $m + n \ge \dim B$. The equality is a straightforward application of the going-down property. Q.E.D.

Proposition—If $R$ is a noetherian ring, then
$$\dim R + 1 = \dim R[x] = \dim R[\![x]\!].$$

Proof: If $\mathfrak{p}_0 \subsetneq \mathfrak{p}_1 \subsetneq \cdots \subsetneq \mathfrak{p}_n$ are a chain of prime ideals in $R$, then $\mathfrak{p}_iR[x]$ are a chain of prime ideals in $R[x]$ while $\mathfrak{p}_nR[x]$ is not a maximal ideal. Thus, $\dim R + 1 \le \dim R[x]$. For the reverse inequality, let $\mathfrak{m}$ be a maximal ideal of $R[x]$ and $\mathfrak{p} = R \cap \mathfrak{m}$. Clearly, $R[x]_\mathfrak{m} = R_{\mathfrak{p}}[x]_\mathfrak{m}$. Since $R[x]_{\mathfrak{m}} / \mathfrak{p} R_{\mathfrak{p}} R[x]_{\mathfrak{m}} = (R_{\mathfrak{p}}/\mathfrak{p}R_{\mathfrak{p}})[x]_{\mathfrak{m}}$ is then a localization of a principal ideal domain and has dimension at most one, we get $1 + \dim R \ge 1 + \dim R_\mathfrak{p} \ge \dim R[x]_\mathfrak{m}$ by the previous inequality. Since $\mathfrak{m}$ is arbitrary, it follows $1 + \dim R \ge \dim R[x]$. Q.E.D.

=== Nagata's altitude formula ===
Theorem—Let $R \subset R'$ be integral domains, $\mathfrak{p}' \subset R'$ be a prime ideal and $\mathfrak{p} = R \cap \mathfrak{p}'$. If $R$ is a Noetherian ring, then
$$\dim R'_{\mathfrak{p}'} + \operatorname{tr.deg}_{R/\mathfrak{p}} {R'/\mathfrak{p}'} \le \dim R_{\mathfrak{p}} + \operatorname{tr.deg}_{R} {R'}$$
where the equality holds if either (a) $R$ is universally catenary and $R'$ is finitely generated $R$-algebra or (b) $R'$ is a polynomial ring over $R$.

Proof: First suppose $R'$ is a polynomial ring. By induction on the number of variables, it is enough to consider the case $R' = R[x]$. Since $R'$ is flat over $R$,
$$\dim R'_{\mathfrak{p'}} = \dim R_{\mathfrak{p}} + \dim \kappa(\mathfrak{p}) \otimes_R {R'}_{\mathfrak{p}'}.$$
By Noether's normalization lemma, the second term on the right side is:
$$\dim \kappa(\mathfrak{p}) \otimes_R R' - \dim \kappa(\mathfrak{p}) \otimes_R R'/\mathfrak{p}' = 1 - \operatorname{tr.deg}_{\kappa(\mathfrak{p})} \kappa(\mathfrak{p}') = \operatorname{tr.deg}_R R' - \operatorname{tr.deg} \kappa(\mathfrak{p}').$$
Next, suppose $R'$ is generated by a single element; thus, $R' = R[x]/I$. If $I$ = 0, then we are already done. Suppose not. Then $R'$ is algebraic over $R$ and so $\operatorname{tr.deg}_R R' = 0$. Since $R$ is a subring of $R'$, $I \cap R = 0$ and so $\operatorname{ht} I = \dim R[x]_I = \dim Q(R)[x]_I = 1 - \operatorname{tr.deg}_{Q(R)} \kappa(I) = 1$ since $\kappa(I) = Q(R')$ is algebraic over $Q(R)$. Let $\mathfrak{p}^{\prime c}$ denote the pre-image in $R[x]$ of $\mathfrak{p}'$. Then, as $\kappa(\mathfrak{p}^{\prime c}) = \kappa(\mathfrak{p})$, by the polynomial case,
$$\operatorname{ht}{\mathfrak{p}'} = \operatorname{ht}{\mathfrak{p}^{\prime c}/I} \le \operatorname{ht}{\mathfrak{p}^{\prime c}} - \operatorname{ht}{I} = \dim R_{\mathfrak{p}} - \operatorname{tr.deg}_{\kappa(\mathfrak{p})} \kappa(\mathfrak{p}').$$
Here, note that the inequality is the equality if $R'$ is catenary. Finally, working with a chain of prime ideals, it is straightforward to reduce the general case to the above case. Q.E.D.

== Homological methods ==
=== Regular rings ===
Let $R$ be a noetherian ring. The projective dimension of a finite $R$-module $M$ is the shortest length of any projective resolution of $M$ (possibly infinite) and is denoted by $\operatorname{pd}_R M$. We set $\operatorname{gl.dim} R = \sup \{ \operatorname{pd}_R M \mid M\text{ is a finite module} \}$; it is called the global dimension of $R$.

Assume $R$ is local with residue field $k$.

Lemma—$\operatorname{pd}_R k = \operatorname{gl.dim} R$ (possibly infinite).

Proof: We claim: for any finite $R$-module $M$,
$$\operatorname{pd}_R M \le n \Leftrightarrow \operatorname{Tor}^R_{n+1}(M, k) = 0.$$
By dimension shifting (cf. the proof of Theorem of Serre below), it is enough to prove this for $n = 0$. But then, by the local criterion for flatness, $\operatorname{Tor}^R_1(M, k) = 0 \Rightarrow M\text{ flat } \Rightarrow M\text{ free } \Rightarrow \operatorname{pd}_R(M) \le 0.$ Now,
$$\operatorname{gl.dim} R \le n \Rightarrow \operatorname{pd}_R k \le n \Rightarrow \operatorname{Tor}^R_{n+1}(-, k) = 0 \Rightarrow \operatorname{pd}_R - \le n \Rightarrow \operatorname{gl.dim} R \le n,$$
completing the proof. Q.E.D.

Remark: The proof also shows that $\operatorname{pd}_R K = \operatorname{pd}_R M - 1$ if $M$ is not free and $K$ is the kernel of some surjection from a free module to $M$.

Lemma—Let $R_1 = R/fR$, $f$ a non-zerodivisor of $R$. If $f$ is a non-zerodivisor on $M$, then
$$\operatorname{pd}_R M \ge \operatorname{pd}_{R_1} (M \otimes R_1).$$

Proof: If $\operatorname{pd}_R M = 0$, then $M$ is $R$-free and thus $M \otimes R_1$ is $R_1$-free. Next suppose $\operatorname{pd}_R M > 0$. Then we have: $\operatorname{pd}_R K = \operatorname{pd}_R M - 1$ as in the remark above. Thus, by induction, it is enough to consider the case $\operatorname{pd}_R M = 1$. Then there is a projective resolution: $0 \to P_1 \to P_0 \to M \to 0$, which gives:
$$\operatorname{Tor}^R_1(M, R_1) \to P_1 \otimes R_1 \to P_0 \otimes R_1 \to M \otimes R_1 \to 0.$$
But $\operatorname{Tor}^R_1(M, R_1) = {}_f M = \{ m \in M \mid fm = 0 \} = 0.$ Hence, $\operatorname{pd}_R (M \otimes R_1)$ is at most 1. Q.E.D.

Theorem of Serre—$R$ regular $\Leftrightarrow \operatorname{gl.dim}R < \infty \Leftrightarrow \operatorname{gl.dim}R = \dim R.$

Proof: If $R$ is regular, we can write $k = R/(f_1, \dots, f_n)$, $f_i$ a regular system of parameters. An exact sequence $0 \to M \overset{f}\to M \to M_1 \to 0$, some $f$ in the maximal ideal, of finite modules, $\operatorname{pd}_R M < \infty$, gives us:
$$0 = \operatorname{Tor}^R_{i+1}(M, k) \to \operatorname{Tor}^R_{i+1}(M_1, k) \to \operatorname{Tor}^R_i(M, k) \overset{f}\to \operatorname{Tor}^R_i(M, k), \quad i \ge \operatorname{pd}_R M.$$
But $f$ here is zero since it kills $k$. Thus, $\operatorname{Tor}^R_{i+1}(M_1, k) \simeq \operatorname{Tor}^R_i(M, k)$ and consequently $\operatorname{pd}_R M_1 = 1 + \operatorname{pd}_R M$. Using this, we get:
$$\operatorname{pd}_R k = 1 + \operatorname{pd}_R (R/(f_1, \dots, f_{n-1})) = \cdots = n.$$
The proof of the converse is by induction on $\dim R$. We begin with the inductive step. Set $R_1 = R/f_1 R$, $f_1$ among a system of parameters. To show $R$ is regular, it is enough to show $R_1$ is regular. But, since $\dim R_1 < \dim R$, by inductive hypothesis and the preceding lemma with $M = \mathfrak{m}$,
$$\operatorname{gl.dim} R < \infty \Rightarrow \operatorname{gl.dim} R_1 = \operatorname{pd}_{R_1} k \le \operatorname{pd}_{R_1} \mathfrak{m} / f_1 \mathfrak{m} < \infty \Rightarrow R_1 \text{ regular}.$$

The basic step remains. Suppose $\dim R = 0$. We claim $\operatorname{gl.dim}R = 0$ if it is finite. (This would imply that $R$ is a semisimple local ring; i.e., a field.) If that is not the case, then there is some finite module $M$ with $0 < \operatorname{pd}_R M < \infty$ and thus in fact we can find $M$ with $\operatorname{pd}_R M = 1$. By Nakayama's lemma, there is a surjection $F \to M$ from a free module $F$ to $M$ whose kernel $K$ is contained in $\mathfrak{m} F$. Since $\dim R = 0$, the maximal ideal $\mathfrak{m}$ is an associated prime of $R$; i.e., $\mathfrak{m} = \operatorname{ann}(s)$ for some nonzero $s$ in $R$. Since $K \subset \mathfrak{m} F$, $s K = 0$. Since $K$ is not zero and is free, this implies $s = 0$, which is absurd. Q.E.D.

Corollary—A regular local ring is a unique factorization domain.

Proof: Let $R$ be a regular local ring. Then $\operatorname{gr}R \simeq k[x_1, \dots, x_d]$, which is an integrally closed domain. It is a standard algebra exercise to show this implies that $R$ is an integrally closed domain. Now, we need to show every divisorial ideal is principal; i.e., the divisor class group of $R$ vanishes. But, according to Bourbaki, Algèbre commutative, chapitre 7, §. 4. Corollary 2 to Proposition 16, a divisorial ideal is principal if it admits a finite free resolution, which is indeed the case by the theorem. Q.E.D.

Theorem—Let $R$ be a ring. Then
$$\operatorname{gl.dim} R[x_1, \dots, x_n] = \operatorname{gl.dim} R + n.$$

=== Depth ===
Let $R$ be a ring and $M$ a module over it. A sequence of elements $x_1, \dots, x_n$ in $R$ is called an $M$-regular sequence if $x_1$ is not a zero-divisor on $M$ and $x_i$ is not a zero divisor on $M/(x_1, \dots, x_{i-1})M$ for each $i = 2, \dots, n$. A priori, it is not obvious whether any permutation of a regular sequence is still regular (see the section below for some positive answer).

Let $R$ be a local Noetherian ring with maximal ideal $\mathfrak{m}$ and put $k = R/\mathfrak{m}$. Then, by definition, the depth of a finite $R$-module $M$ is the supremum of the lengths of all $M$-regular sequences in $\mathfrak{m}$. For example, we have $\operatorname{depth} M = 0 \Leftrightarrow \mathfrak{m}$ consists of zerodivisors on $M$ $\Leftrightarrow \mathfrak{m}$ is associated with $M$. By induction, we find
$$\operatorname{depth} M \le \dim R/{\mathfrak{p}}$$
for any associated primes $\mathfrak{p}$ of $M$. In particular, $\operatorname{depth} M \le \dim M$. If the equality holds for $M$ = $R$, $R$ is called a Cohen–Macaulay ring.

Example: A regular Noetherian local ring is Cohen–Macaulay (since a regular system of parameters is an $R$-regular sequence).

In general, a Noetherian ring is called a Cohen–Macaulay ring if the localizations at all maximal ideals are Cohen–Macaulay. We note that a Cohen–Macaulay ring is universally catenary. This implies for example that a polynomial ring $k[x_1, \dots, x_d]$ is universally catenary since it is regular and thus Cohen–Macaulay.

Proposition (Rees)—Let $M$ be a finite $R$-module. Then the Ext functor satisfies $\operatorname{depth} M = \sup \{ n \mid \operatorname{Ext}_R^i(k, M) = 0, i < n \}$.

More generally, for any finite $R$-module $N$ whose support is exactly $\{ \mathfrak{m} \}$,
$$\operatorname{depth} M = \sup \{ n \mid \operatorname{Ext}_R^i(N, M) = 0, i < n \}.$$

Proof: We first prove by induction on $n$ the following statement: for every $R$-module $M$ and every $M$-regular sequence $x_1, \dots, x_n$ in $\mathfrak{m}$,

$$\operatorname{Ext}_R^n(N, M) \simeq \operatorname{Hom}_R(N, M/(x_1, \dots, x_n) M).$$	⁎

The basic step $n$ = 0 is trivial. Next, by inductive hypothesis, $\operatorname{Ext}_R^{n-1}(N, M) \simeq \operatorname{Hom}_R(N, M/(x_1, \dots, x_{n-1}) M)$. But the latter is zero since the annihilator of $N$ contains some power of $x_n$. Thus, from the exact sequence $0 \to M \overset{x_1} \to M \to M_1 \to 0$ and the fact that $x_1$ kills $N$, using the inductive hypothesis again, we get
$$\operatorname{Ext}^n_R(N, M) \simeq \operatorname{Ext}^{n-1}_R(N, M/x_1 M) \simeq \operatorname{Hom}_R(N, M/(x_1, \dots, x_n) M),$$
proving (⁎). Now, if $n < \operatorname{depth} M$, then we can find an $M$-regular sequence of length more than $n$ and so by (⁎) we see $\operatorname{Ext}_R^n(N, M) = 0$. It remains to show $\operatorname{Ext}_R^n(N, M) \ne 0$ if $n = \operatorname{depth} M$. By (⁎) we can assume $n$ = 0. Then $\mathfrak{m}$ is associated with $M$; thus is in the support of $M$. On the other hand, $\mathfrak{m} \in \operatorname{Supp}(N).$ It follows by linear algebra that there is a nonzero homomorphism from $N$ to $M$ modulo $\mathfrak{m}$; hence, one from $N$ to $M$ by Nakayama's lemma. Q.E.D.

The Auslander–Buchsbaum formula relates depth and projective dimension.

Theorem—Let $M$ be a finite module over a noetherian local ring $R$. If $\operatorname{pd}_R M < \infty$, then
$$\operatorname{pd}_R M + \operatorname{depth} M = \operatorname{depth} R.$$

Proof: We argue by induction on $\operatorname{pd}_R M$, the basic case (i.e., $M$ free) being trivial. By Nakayama's lemma, we have the exact sequence $0 \to K \overset{f}\to F \to M \to 0$ where $F$ is free and the image of $f$ is contained in $\mathfrak{m} F$. Since $\operatorname{pd}_R K = \operatorname{pd}_R M - 1,$ what we need to show is $\operatorname{depth} K = \operatorname{depth} M + 1$. Since $f$ kills $k$, the exact sequence yields: for any $i$,
$$\operatorname{Ext}_R^i(k, F) \to \operatorname{Ext}_R^i(k, M) \to \operatorname{Ext}_R^{i+1}(k, K) \to 0.$$
Note the left-most term is zero if $i < \operatorname{depth} R$. If $i < \operatorname{depth} K - 1$, then since $\operatorname{depth} K \le \operatorname{depth} R$ by inductive hypothesis, we see $\operatorname{Ext}_R^i(k, M) = 0.$ If $i = \operatorname{depth} K - 1$, then $\operatorname{Ext}_R^{i+1}(k, K) \ne 0$ and it must be $\operatorname{Ext}_R^i(k, M) \ne 0.$ Q.E.D.

As a matter of notation, for any $R$-module $M$, we let
$$\Gamma_{\mathfrak{m}}(M) = \{ s \in M \mid \operatorname{supp}(s) \subset \{ \mathfrak{m} \} \} = \{ s \in M \mid \mathfrak{m}^j s = 0 \text{ for some } j \}.$$
One sees without difficulty that $\Gamma_{\mathfrak{m}}$ is a left-exact functor and then let $H^j_{\mathfrak{m}} = R^j \Gamma_{\mathfrak{m}}$ be its $j$-th right derived functor, called the local cohomology of $R$. Since $\Gamma_{\mathfrak{m}}(M) = \varinjlim \operatorname{Hom}_R(R/\mathfrak{m}^j, M)$, via abstract nonsense,
$$H^i_{\mathfrak{m}}(M) = \varinjlim \operatorname{Ext}^i_R (R/{\mathfrak{m}}^j, M).$$
This observation proves the first part of the theorem below.

Theorem (Grothendieck)—Let $M$ be a finite $R$-module. Then

1. $\operatorname{depth} \operatorname{M} = \sup \{ n \mid H^i_{\mathfrak{m}}(M) = 0, i < n \}$.
2. $H_{\mathfrak{m} }^i(M) = 0, i > \dim M$ and $\ne 0$ if $i = \dim M.$
3. If $R$ is complete and $d$ its Krull dimension and if $E$ is the injective hull of $k$, then
  $$\operatorname{Hom}_R(H^d_{ \mathfrak{m} }(-), E)$$
  is representable (the representing object is sometimes called the canonical module especially if $R$ is Cohen–Macaulay).

Proof: 1. is already noted (except to show the nonvanishing at the degree equal to the depth of $M$; use induction to see this) and 3. is a general fact by abstract nonsense. 2. is a consequence of an explicit computation of a local cohomology by means of Koszul complexes (see below). $\square$

=== Koszul complex ===
Let $R$ be a ring and $x$ an element in it. We form the chain complex $K$($x$) given by $K(x)_i = R$ for $i$ = 0, 1 and $K(x)_i = 0$ for any other $i$ with the differential
$$d: K_1(R) \to K_0(R), \, r \mapsto xr.$$
For any $R$-module $M$, we then get the complex $K(x, M) = K(x) \otimes_R M$ with the differential $d \otimes 1$ and let $\operatorname{H}_*(x, M) = \operatorname{H}_*(K(x, M))$ be its homology. Note:
$$\operatorname{H}_0(x, M) = M/xM ,$$
$$\operatorname{H}_1(x, M) = {}_x M = \{ m \in M \mid xm = 0 \}.$$

More generally, given a finite sequence $x_1, \dots, x_n$ of elements in a ring $R$, we form the tensor product of complexes:
$$K(x_1, \dots, x_n) = K(x_1) \otimes \dots \otimes K(x_n)$$
and let $\operatorname{H}_*(x_1, \dots, x_n, M) = \operatorname{H}_*(K(x_1, \dots, x_n, M))$ its homology. As before,
$$\operatorname{H}_0(\underline{x}, M) = M/(x_1, \dots, x_n)M,$$
$$\operatorname{H}_n(\underline{x}, M) = \operatorname{Ann}_M((x_1, \dots, x_n)).$$

We now have the homological characterization of a regular sequence.

Theorem—Suppose $R$ is Noetherian, $M$ is a finite module over $R$ and $x_i$ are in the Jacobson radical of $R$. Then the following are equivalent

1. $\underline{x}$ is an $M$-regular sequence.
2. $\operatorname{H}_i(\underline{x}, M) = 0, i \ge 1$.
3. $\operatorname{H}_1(\underline{x}, M) = 0$.

Corollary—The sequence $x_i$ is $M$-regular if and only if any of its permutations is so.

Corollary—If $x_1, \dots, x_n$ is an $M$-regular sequence, then $x_1^j, \dots, x_n^j$ is also an $M$-regular sequence for each positive integer $j$.

A Koszul complex is a powerful computational tool. For instance, it follows from the theorem and the corollary
$$\operatorname{H}^i_{\mathfrak{m}}(M) \simeq \varinjlim \operatorname{H}^i(K(x_1^j, \dots, x_n^j; M))$$
(Here, one uses the self-duality of a Koszul complex; see Proposition 17.15. of Eisenbud, Commutative Algebra with a View Toward Algebraic Geometry.)

Another instance would be

Theorem—Assume $R$ is local. Then let
$$s = \dim_k \mathfrak{m}/\mathfrak{m}^2,$$
the dimension of the Zariski tangent space (often called the embedding dimension of $R$). Then
$$\binom{s}{i} \le \dim_k \operatorname{Tor}^R_i(k, k).$$

Remark: The theorem can be used to give a second quick proof of Serre's theorem, that $R$ is regular if and only if it has finite global dimension. Indeed, by the above theorem, $\operatorname{Tor}^R_s(k, k) \ne 0$ and thus $\operatorname{gl.dim} R \ge s$. On the other hand, as $\operatorname{gl.dim} R = \operatorname{pd}_R k$, the Auslander–Buchsbaum formula gives $\operatorname{gl.dim} R = \dim R$. Hence, $\dim R \le s \le \operatorname{gl.dim} R = \dim R$.

We next use a Koszul homology to define and study complete intersection rings. Let $R$ be a Noetherian local ring. By definition, the first deviation of $R$ is the vector space dimension
$$\epsilon_1(R) = \dim_k \operatorname{H}_1(\underline{x})$$
where $\underline{x} = (x_1, \dots, x_d)$ is a system of parameters. By definition, $R$ is a complete intersection ring if $\dim R + \epsilon_1(R)$ is the dimension of the tangent space. (See Hartshorne for a geometric meaning.)

Theorem—$R$ is a complete intersection ring if and only if its Koszul algebra is an exterior algebra.

=== Injective dimension and Tor dimensions ===
Let $R$ be a ring. The injective dimension of an $R$-module $M$ denoted by $\operatorname{id}_R M$ is defined just like a projective dimension: it is the minimal length of an injective resolution of $M$. Let $\operatorname{Mod}_R$ be the category of $R$-modules.

Theorem—For any ring $R$,
$$\begin{align}
\operatorname{gl.dim} R \, &= \operatorname{sup} \{ \operatorname{id}_R M \mid M \in \operatorname{Mod}_R \} \\
&= \inf \{ n \mid \operatorname{Ext}^i_R(M, N) = 0, \, i > n, M, N \in \operatorname{Mod}_R \}
\end{align}$$

Proof: Suppose $\operatorname{gl.dim} R \le n$. Let $M$ be an $R$-module and consider a resolution
$$0 \to M \to I_0 \overset{\phi_0}\to I_1 \to \dots \to I_{n-1} \overset{\phi_{n-1}}\to N \to 0$$
where $I_i$ are injective modules. For any ideal $I$,
$$\operatorname{Ext}^1_R(R/I, N) \simeq \operatorname{Ext}^2_R(R/I, \operatorname{ker}(\phi_{n-1})) \simeq \dots \simeq \operatorname{Ext}_R^{n+1}(R/I, M),$$
which is zero since $\operatorname{Ext}_R^{n+1}(R/I, -)$ is computed via a projective resolution of $R/I$. Thus, by Baer's criterion, $N$ is injective. We conclude that $\sup \{ \operatorname{id}_R M | M \} \le n$. Essentially by reversing the arrows, one can also prove the implication in the other way. Q.E.D.

The theorem suggests that we consider a sort of a dual of a global dimension:
$$\operatorname{w.gl.dim} = \inf \{ n \mid \operatorname{Tor}^R_i(M, N) = 0, \, i > n, M, N \in \operatorname{Mod}_R \} .$$
It was originally called the weak global dimension of $R$ but today it is more commonly called the Tor dimension of $R$.

Remark: for any ring $R$, $\operatorname{w.gl.dim} R \le \operatorname{gl.dim} R$.

Proposition—A ring has weak global dimension zero if and only if it is von Neumann regular.

== Dimensions of non-commutative rings ==
Let $A$ be a graded algebra over a field $k$. If $V$ is a finite-dimensional generating subspace of $A$, then we let $f(n) = \dim_k V^n$ and then put
$$\operatorname{gk}(A) = \limsup_{n \to \infty} {\log f(n) \over \log n}.$$
It is called the Gelfand–Kirillov dimension of $A$. It is easy to show $\operatorname{gk}(A)$ is independent of a choice of $V$. Given a graded right (or left) module $M$ over $A$ one may similarly define the Gelfand-Kirillov dimension ${gk}(M)$ of $M$.

Example: If $A$ is finite-dimensional, then gk($A$) = 0. If $A$ is an affine ring, then gk($A$) = Krull dimension of $A$.

Example: If $A_n = k[x_1, ..., x_n, \partial_1, ..., \partial_n]$ is the n-th Weyl algebra then $\operatorname{gk}(A_n) = 2n.$

== See also ==
- Multiplicity theory
- Bass number
- Perfect complex
- amplitude
