= Multiplicity theory =

In abstract algebra, multiplicity theory concerns the multiplicity of a module M at an ideal I (often a maximal ideal)

$$\mathbf{e}_I(M).$$

The notion of the multiplicity of a module is a generalization of the degree of a projective variety. By Serre's intersection formula, it is linked to an intersection multiplicity in the intersection theory.

The main focus of the theory is to detect and measure a singular point of an algebraic variety (cf. resolution of singularities). Because of this aspect, valuation theory, Rees algebras and integral closure are intimately connected to multiplicity theory.

== Multiplicity of a module ==
Let R be a positively graded ring such that R is finitely generated as an R_{0}-algebra and R_{0} is Artinian. Note that R has finite Krull dimension d. Let M be a finitely generated R-module and F_{M}(t) its Hilbert–Poincaré series. This series is a rational function of the form

$$\frac{P(t)}{(1-t)^d},$$

where $P(t)$ is a polynomial. By definition, the multiplicity of M is

$$\mathbf{e}(M) = P(1).$$

The series may be rewritten

$$F(t) = \sum_1^d {a_{d-i} \over (1 - t)^d} + r(t).$$

where r(t) is a polynomial. Note that $a_{d-i}$ are the coefficients of the Hilbert polynomial of M expanded in binomial coefficients. We have

$$\mathbf{e}(M) = a_0.$$

As Hilbert–Poincaré series are additive on exact sequences, the multiplicity is additive on exact sequences of modules of the same dimension.

The following theorem, due to Christer Lech, gives a priori bounds for multiplicity.

Lech—Suppose R is local with maximal ideal $\mathfrak{m}$. If an I is $\mathfrak{m}$-primary ideal, then

$$e(I) \le d! \deg(R) \lambda(R/\overline{I}).$$

== See also ==
- Dimension theory (algebra)
- j-multiplicity
- Hilbert–Samuel multiplicity
- Hilbert–Kunz function
- Normally flat ring
