= Irreducible ideal =

In mathematics, a proper ideal of a commutative ring is said to be irreducible if it cannot be written as the intersection of two strictly larger ideals.

== Examples ==
- Every prime ideal is irreducible. Let $J$ and $K$ be ideals of a commutative ring $R$, with neither one contained in the other. Then there exist $a\in J \setminus K$ and $b\in K \setminus J$, where neither is in $J \cap K$ but the product is. This proves that a reducible ideal is not prime. A concrete example of this are the ideals $2 \mathbb Z$ and $3 \mathbb Z$ contained in $\mathbb Z$. The intersection is $6 \mathbb Z$, and $6 \mathbb Z$ is not a prime ideal.
- Every irreducible ideal of a Noetherian ring is a primary ideal, and consequently for Noetherian rings an irreducible decomposition is a primary decomposition.
- Every primary ideal of a principal ideal domain is an irreducible ideal.
- Every irreducible ideal is primal.
- Every irreducible ideal that is also radical is prime. The ideal $4\mathbb{Z}$ is an example of an irreducible ideal in $\ce{\mathbb{Z}}$ that is not radical and not a prime ideal.

== Properties ==
An element of an integral domain is prime if and only if the ideal generated by it is a non-zero prime ideal. This is not true for irreducible ideals; an irreducible ideal may be generated by an element that is not an irreducible element, as is the case in $\mathbb Z$ for the ideal $4 \mathbb Z$ since it is not the intersection of two strictly greater ideals.

In algebraic geometry, if an ideal $I$ of a ring $R$ is irreducible, then $V(I)$ is an irreducible subset in the Zariski topology on the spectrum $\operatorname{Spec} R$. The converse does not hold; for example the ideal $(x^2,xy,y^2)$ in $\mathbb C[x,y]$ defines the irreducible variety consisting of just the origin, but it is not an irreducible ideal as $(x^2,xy,y^2) = (x^2,y) \cap (x,y^2)$.

== See also ==
- Irreducible module
- Irreducible space
- Laskerian ring
