= Primary decomposition =

In algebra, expression of an ideal as the intersection of ideals of a specific type

In mathematics, the Lasker–Noether theorem states that every Noetherian ring is a Lasker ring, which means that every ideal can be decomposed as an intersection, called primary decomposition, of finitely many primary ideals (which are related to, but not quite the same as, powers of prime ideals). The theorem was first proven by Emanuel Lasker (1905) for the special case of polynomial rings and convergent power series rings, and was proven in its full generality by Emmy Noether (1921).

The Lasker–Noether theorem is an extension of the fundamental theorem of arithmetic, and more generally the fundamental theorem of finitely generated abelian groups to all Noetherian rings. The theorem plays an important role in algebraic geometry, by asserting that every algebraic set may be uniquely decomposed into a finite union of irreducible components.

It has a straightforward extension to modules stating that every submodule of a finitely generated module over a Noetherian ring is a finite intersection of primary submodules. This contains the case for rings as a special case, considering the ring as a module over itself, so that ideals are submodules. This also generalizes the primary decomposition form of the structure theorem for finitely generated modules over a principal ideal domain, and for the special case of polynomial rings over a field, it generalizes the decomposition of an algebraic set into a finite union of (irreducible) varieties.

The first algorithm for computing primary decompositions for polynomial rings over a field of characteristic 0 (Note: Primary decomposition requires testing irreducibility of polynomials, which is not always algorithmically possible in nonzero characteristic.) was published by Noether's student Grete Hermann (1926). The decomposition does not hold in general for non-commutative Noetherian rings. Noether gave an example of a non-commutative Noetherian ring with a right ideal that is not an intersection of primary ideals.

== Primary decomposition of an ideal ==
Let $R$ be a Noetherian commutative ring. An ideal $I$ of $R$ is called primary if it is a proper ideal and for each pair of elements $x$ and $y$ in $R$ such that $xy$ is in $I$, either $x$ or some power of $y$ is in $I$; equivalently, every zero-divisor in the quotient $R/I$ is nilpotent. The radical of a primary ideal $Q$ is a prime ideal and $Q$ is said to be $\mathfrak{p}$-primary for $\mathfrak{p} = \sqrt{Q}$.

Let $I$ be an ideal in $R$. Then $I$ has an irredundant primary decomposition into primary ideals:

$$I = Q_1 \cap \cdots \cap Q_n\$$.

Irredundancy means:

- Removing any of the $Q_i$ changes the intersection, i.e. for each $i$ we have: $\cap_{j \ne i} Q_j \not\subset Q_i$.
- The prime ideals $\sqrt{Q_i}$ are all distinct.

Moreover, this decomposition is unique in the two ways:

- The set $\{ \sqrt{Q_i} \mid i \}$ is uniquely determined by $I$, and
- If $\mathfrak{p} = \sqrt{Q_i}$ is a minimal element of the above set, then $Q_i$ is uniquely determined by $I$; in fact, $Q_i$ is the pre-image of $I R_{\mathfrak{p}}$ under the localization map $R \to R_{\mathfrak{p}}$.

Primary ideals which correspond to non-minimal prime ideals over $I$ are in general not unique (see an example below). For the existence of the decomposition, see #Primary decomposition from associated primes below.

The elements of $\{ \sqrt{Q_i} \mid i \}$ are called the prime divisors of $I$ or the primes belonging to $I$. In the language of module theory, as discussed below, the set $\{ \sqrt{Q_i} \mid i \}$ is also the set of associated primes of the $R$-module $R/I$. Explicitly, that means that there exist elements $g_1, \dots, g_n$ in $R$ such that

$\sqrt{Q_i} = \{ f \in R \mid fg_i \in I \}.$

By a way of shortcut, some authors call an associated prime of $R/I$ simply an associated prime of $I$ (note this practice will conflict with the usage in the module theory).

- The minimal elements of $\{ \sqrt{Q_i} \mid i \}$ are the same as the minimal prime ideals containing $I$ and are called isolated primes.
- The non-minimal elements, on the other hand, are called the embedded primes.

In the case of the ring of integers $\mathbb Z$, the Lasker–Noether theorem is equivalent to the fundamental theorem of arithmetic. If an integer $n$ has prime factorization $n = \pm p_1^{d_1} \cdots p_r^{d_r}$, then the primary decomposition of the ideal $\langle n \rangle$ generated by $n$ in $\mathbb Z$, is

$$\langle n\rangle = \langle p_1^{d_1} \rangle \cap \cdots \cap \langle p_r^{d_r}\rangle.$$

Similarly, in a unique factorization domain, if an element has a prime factorization $f = u p_1^{d_1} \cdots p_r^{d_r},$ where $u$ is a unit, then the primary decomposition of the principal ideal generated by $f$ is

$$\langle f\rangle = \langle p_1^{d_1} \rangle \cap \cdots \cap \langle p_r^{d_r}\rangle.$$

=== Examples ===
The examples of the section are designed for illustrating some properties of primary decompositions, which may appear as surprising or counter-intuitive. All examples are ideals in a polynomial ring over a field k.

==== Intersection vs. product ====
The primary decomposition in $k[x,y,z]$ of the ideal $I=\langle x,yz \rangle$ is

$$I = \langle x,yz \rangle = \langle x,y \rangle \cap \langle x,z \rangle.$$

Because of the generator of degree one, I is not the product of two larger ideals. A similar example is given, in two indeterminates by

$$I = \langle x,y(y+1) \rangle = \langle x,y \rangle \cap \langle x,y+1 \rangle.$$

==== Primary vs. prime power ====
In $k[x,y]$, the ideal $\langle x,y^2 \rangle$ is a primary ideal that has $\langle x,y \rangle$ as associated prime. It is not a power of its associated prime.

==== Non-uniqueness and embedded prime ====
For every positive integer n, a primary decomposition in $k[x,y]$ of the ideal $I=\langle x^2, xy \rangle$ is

$$I = \langle x^2,xy \rangle = \langle x \rangle \cap \langle x^2, xy, y^n \rangle.$$

The associated primes are

$$\langle x \rangle \subset \langle x,y \rangle.$$

Example: Let N = R = k[x, y] for some field k, and let M be the ideal (xy, y^{2}). Then M has two different minimal primary decompositions M = (y) ∩ (x, y^{2}) = (y) ∩ (x + y, y^{2}). The minimal prime is (y) and the embedded prime is (x, y).

==== Non-associated prime between two associated primes ====
In $k[x,y,z],$ the ideal $I=\langle x^2, xy, xz \rangle$ has the (non-unique) primary decomposition

$$I = \langle x^2,xy, xz \rangle = \langle x \rangle \cap \langle x^2, y^2, z^2, xy, xz, yz \rangle.$$

The associated prime ideals are $\langle x \rangle \subset \langle x,y,z \rangle,$ and $\langle x, y \rangle$ is a non associated prime ideal such that

$$\langle x \rangle \subset \langle x,y \rangle \subset \langle x,y,z \rangle.$$

==== A complicated example ====
Unless for very simple examples, a primary decomposition may be hard to compute and may have a very complicated output. The following example has been designed to provide just such a complicated output, while, nevertheless, being accessible to hand-written computation.

Let

$$\begin {align}
P&=a_0x^m + a_1x^{m-1}y +\cdots +a_my^m \\
Q&=b_0x^n + b_1x^{n-1}y +\cdots +b_ny^n
\end {align}$$

be two homogeneous polynomials in x, y, whose coefficients $a_1, \ldots, a_m, b_0, \ldots, b_n$ are polynomials in other indeterminates $z_1, \ldots, z_h$ over a field k. That is, P and Q belong to $R=k[x,y,z_1, \ldots, z_h],$ and it is in this ring that a primary decomposition of the ideal $I=\langle P,Q\rangle$ is searched. For computing the primary decomposition, we suppose first that 1 is a greatest common divisor of P and Q.

This condition implies that I has no primary component of height one. As I is generated by two elements, this implies that it is a complete intersection (more precisely, it defines an algebraic set, which is a complete intersection), and thus all primary components have height two. Therefore, the associated primes of I are exactly the primes ideals of height two that contain I.

It follows that $\langle x,y\rangle$ is an associated prime of I.

Let $D\in k[z_1, \ldots, z_h]$ be the homogeneous resultant in x, y of P and Q. As the greatest common divisor of P and Q is a constant, the resultant D is not zero, and resultant theory implies that I contains all products of D by a monomial in x, y of degree m + n – 1. As $D\not\in \langle x,y\rangle,$ all these monomials belong to the primary component contained in $\langle x,y\rangle.$ This primary component contains P and Q, and the behavior of primary decompositions under localization shows that this primary component is

$$\{t|\exists e, D^et \in I\}.$$

In short, we have a primary component, with the very simple associated prime $\langle x,y\rangle,$ such all its generating sets involve all indeterminates.

The other primary component contains D. One may prove that if P and Q are sufficiently generic (for example if the coefficients of P and Q are distinct indeterminates), then there is only another primary component, which is a prime ideal, and is generated by P, Q and D.

=== Geometric interpretation ===
In algebraic geometry, an affine algebraic set V(I) is defined as the set of the common zeros of an ideal I of a polynomial ring $R=k[x_1,\ldots, x_n].$

An irredundant primary decomposition

$$I=Q_1\cap\cdots\cap Q_r$$

of I defines a decomposition of V(I) into a union of algebraic sets V(Q_{i}), which are irreducible, as not being the union of two smaller algebraic sets.

If $P_i$ is the associated prime of $Q_i$, then $V(P_i)=V(Q_i),$ and Lasker–Noether theorem shows that V(I) has a unique irredundant decomposition into irreducible algebraic varieties

$$V(I)=\bigcup V(P_i),$$

where the union is restricted to minimal associated primes. These minimal associated primes are the primary components of the radical of I. For this reason, the primary decomposition of the radical of I is sometimes called the prime decomposition of I.

The components of a primary decomposition (as well as of the algebraic set decomposition) corresponding to minimal primes are said isolated, and the others are said embedded.

For the decomposition of algebraic varieties, only the minimal primes are interesting, but in intersection theory, and, more generally in scheme theory, the complete primary decomposition has a geometric meaning.

== Primary decomposition from associated primes ==
Nowadays, it is common to do primary decomposition of ideals and modules within the theory of associated primes. Bourbaki's influential textbook Algèbre commutative, in particular, takes this approach.

Let $R$ be a ring and $M$ a module over it. By definition, an associated prime is a prime ideal which is the annihilator of a nonzero element of $M$; that is, $\mathfrak{p} = \operatorname{Ann}(m)$ for some $m\in M$ (this implies $m \ne 0$). Equivalently, a prime ideal $\mathfrak{p}$ is an associated prime of $M$ if there is an injection of $R$-modules $R/\mathfrak{p} \hookrightarrow M$.

A maximal element of the set of annihilators of nonzero elements of $M$ can be shown to be a prime ideal and thus, when $R$ is a Noetherian ring, there exists an associated prime of $M$ if and only if $M$ is nonzero.

The set of associated primes of $M$ is denoted by $\operatorname{Ass}_R(M)$ or $\operatorname{Ass}(M)$. Directly from the definition,

- If $M = \bigoplus_i M_i$, then $\operatorname{Ass}(M) = \bigcup_i \operatorname{Ass}(M_i)$.
- For an exact sequence $0 \to N \to M \to L \to 0$, $\operatorname{Ass}(N) \subset \operatorname{Ass}(M) \subset \operatorname{Ass}(N) \cup \operatorname{Ass}(L)$.
- If $R$ is a Noetherian ring, then $\operatorname{Ass}(M) \subset \operatorname{Supp}(M)$ where $\operatorname{Supp}$ refers to support. Also, the set of minimal elements of $\operatorname{Ass}(M)$ is the same as the set of minimal elements of $\operatorname{Supp}(M)$.

If $M$ is a finitely generated module over $R$, then there is a finite ascending sequence of submodules

$$0=M_0\subsetneq M_1\subsetneq\cdots\subsetneq M_{n-1}\subsetneq M_n=M\,$$

such that each quotient $M_i/M_{i-1}$ is isomorphic to $R/\mathfrak{p}_i$ for some prime ideals $\mathfrak{p}_i$, each of which is necessarily in the support of $M$. Moreover every associated prime of $M$ occurs among the set of primes $\mathfrak{p}_i$; i.e.,

$\operatorname{Ass}(M) \subset \{ \mathfrak{p}_1, \dots, \mathfrak{p}_n \} \subset \operatorname{Supp}(M)$.

(In general, these inclusions are not the equalities.) In particular, $\operatorname{Ass}(M)$ is a finite set when $M$ is finitely generated.

Let $M$ be a finitely generated module over a Noetherian ring $R$ and $N$ a submodule of $M$. Given $\operatorname{Ass}(M/N) = \{ \mathfrak{p}_1, \dots, \mathfrak{p}_n \}$, the set of associated primes of $M/N$, there exist submodules $Q_i \subset M$ such that $\operatorname{Ass}(M/Q_i) = \{ \mathfrak{p}_i \}$ and

$N = \bigcap_{i=1}^n Q_i.$

A submodule $N$ of $M$ is called $\mathfrak{p}$-primary if $\operatorname{Ass}(M/N) = \{ \mathfrak{p} \}$. A submodule of the $R$-module $R$ is $\mathfrak{p}$-primary as a submodule if and only if it is a $\mathfrak{p}$-primary ideal; thus, when $M = R$, the above decomposition is precisely a primary decomposition of an ideal.

Taking $N = 0$, the above decomposition says the set of associated primes of a finitely generated module $M$ is the same as $\{ \operatorname{Ass}(M/Q_i) \mid i \}$ when $0 = \cap_1^n Q_i$ (without finite generation, there can be infinitely many associated primes.)

== Properties of associated primes ==
Let $R$ be a Noetherian ring. Then

- The set of zero-divisors on $R$ is the same as the union of the associated primes of $R$ (this is because the set of zerodivisors of $R$ is the union of the set of annihilators of nonzero elements, the maximal elements of which are associated primes).
- For the same reason, the union of the associated primes of an $R$-module $M$ is exactly the set of zero-divisors on $M$, that is, an element $r$ such that the endomorphism $m \mapsto rm, M \to M$ is not injective.
- Given a subset $\Phi \subset \operatorname{Ass}(M)$, $M$ an $R$-module, there exists a submodule $N \subset M$ such that $\operatorname{Ass}(N) = \operatorname{Ass}(M) - \Phi$ and $\operatorname{Ass}(M/N) = \Phi$.
- Let $S \subset R$ be a multiplicative subset, $M$ an $R$-module and $\Phi$ the set of all prime ideals of $R$ not intersecting $S$. Then
  $$\mathfrak{p} \mapsto S^{-1}\mathfrak{p}, \, \operatorname{Ass}_R(M)\cap \Phi \to \operatorname{Ass}_{S^{-1}R}(S^{-1} M)$$
  is a bijection. Also, $\operatorname{Ass}_R(M)\cap \Phi = \operatorname{Ass}_R(S^{-1}M)$.
- Any prime ideal minimal with respect to containing an ideal $J$ is in $\mathrm{Ass}_R(R/J).$ These primes are precisely the isolated primes.
- A module $M$ over $R$ has finite length if and only if $M$ is finitely generated and $\mathrm{Ass}(M)$ consists of maximal ideals.
- Let $A \to B$ be a ring homomorphism between Noetherian rings and $F$ a $B$-module that is flat over $A$. Then, for each $A$-module $E$,

$\operatorname{Ass}_B(E \otimes_A F) = \bigcup_{\mathfrak{p} \in \operatorname{Ass}(E)} \operatorname{Ass}_B(F/\mathfrak{p}F)$.

== Non-Noetherian case ==
The next theorem gives necessary and sufficient conditions for a ring to have primary decompositions for its ideals.

Theorem—Let $R$ be a commutative ring. Then the following are equivalent.

1. Every ideal in $R$ has a primary decomposition.
2. $R$ has the following properties:
  - (L1) For every proper ideal $I$ and a prime ideal $\mathfrak{p}$, there exists an $x$ in $R-\mathfrak{p}$ such that $(I:x)$ is the pre-image of $I\,R_{\mathfrak{p}}$ under the localization map $R\to R_{\mathfrak{p}}$.
  - (L2) For every ideal $I$, the set of all pre-images of $I\,S^{-1}R$ under the localization map $R\to S^{-1}R$, with $S$ running over all multiplicatively closed subsets of $R$, is finite.

The proof is given at Chapter 4 of Atiyah–Macdonald as a series of exercises.

There is the following uniqueness theorem for an ideal having a primary decomposition.

Theorem—Let $R$ be a commutative ring and $I$ an ideal. Suppose $I$ has a minimal primary decomposition $I = \bigcap_{i=1}^r \mathfrak q_i$ (note: "minimal" implies $\sqrt{\mathfrak q_i}$ are distinct.) Then

1. The set $E = \left \{ \sqrt{\mathfrak q_i} \mid 1 \le i \le r \right \}$ is the set of all prime ideals in the set $\left\{ \sqrt{(I : x)} \mid x \in R \right\}$.
2. The set of minimal elements of $E$ is the same as the set of minimal prime ideals over $I$. Moreover, the primary ideal corresponding to a minimal prime $\mathfrak{p}$ is the pre-image of $I$ $R_{\mathfrak{p}}$ and thus is uniquely determined by $I$.

Now, for any commutative ring $R$, an ideal $I$ and a minimal prime $\mathfrak{p}$ over $I$, the pre-image of $I\,R_{\mathfrak{p}}$ under the localization map is the smallest $\mathfrak{p}$-primary ideal containing $I$. Thus, in the setting of preceding theorem, the primary ideal $\mathfrak q$ corresponding to a minimal prime $\mathfrak{p}$ is also the smallest $\mathfrak{p}$-primary ideal containing $I$ and is called the $\mathfrak{p}$-primary component of $I$.

For example, if the power $\mathfrak{p}^n$ of a prime $\mathfrak{p}$ has a primary decomposition, then its $\mathfrak{p}$-primary component is the $n$-th symbolic power of $\mathfrak{p}$.

== Additive theory of ideals ==
This result is the first in an area now known as the additive theory of ideals, which studies the ways of representing an ideal as the intersection of a special class of ideals. The decision on the "special class", e.g., primary ideals, is a problem in itself. In the case of non-commutative rings, the class of tertiary ideals is a useful substitute for the class of primary ideals.
