= Krull's principal ideal theorem =

Theorem in commutative algebra

In commutative algebra, Krull's principal ideal theorem, named after Wolfgang Krull (1899–1971), gives a bound on the height of a principal ideal in a commutative Noetherian ring. The theorem is sometimes referred to by its German name, Krulls Hauptidealsatz (from Haupt- ("Principal") + ideal + Satz ("theorem")).

Precisely, if R is a Noetherian ring and I is a principal, proper ideal of R, then each minimal prime ideal containing I has height at most one.

This theorem can be generalized to ideals that are not principal, and the result is often called Krull's height theorem. This says that if R is a Noetherian ring and I is a proper ideal generated by n elements of R, then each minimal prime over I has height at most n. The converse is also true: if a prime ideal has height n, then it is a minimal prime ideal over an ideal generated by n elements.

The principal ideal theorem and the generalization, the height theorem, both follow from the fundamental theorem of dimension theory in commutative algebra (see also below for the direct proofs). Bourbaki's Commutative Algebra gives a direct proof. Kaplansky's Commutative Rings includes a proof due to David Rees.

== Proofs ==
=== Proof of the principal ideal theorem ===
Let $A$ be a Noetherian ring, x an element of it and $\mathfrak{p}$ a minimal prime over x. Replacing A by the localization $A_\mathfrak{p}$, we can assume $A$ is local with the maximal ideal $\mathfrak{p}$. Let $\mathfrak{q} \subsetneq \mathfrak{p}$ be a strictly smaller prime ideal and let $\mathfrak{q}^{(n)} = \mathfrak{q}^n A_{\mathfrak{q}} \cap A$, which is a $\mathfrak{q}$-primary ideal called the n-th symbolic power of $\mathfrak{q}$. It forms a descending chain of ideals $A \supset \mathfrak{q} \supset \mathfrak{q}^{(2)} \supset \mathfrak{q}^{(3)} \supset \cdots$. Thus, there is the descending chain of ideals $\mathfrak{q}^{(n)} + (x)/(x)$ in the ring $\overline{A} = A/(x)$. Now, the radical $\sqrt{(x)}$ is the intersection of all minimal prime ideals containing $x$; $\mathfrak{p}$ is among them. But $\mathfrak{p}$ is a unique maximal ideal and thus $\sqrt{(x)} = \mathfrak{p}$. Since $(x)$ contains some power of its radical, it follows that $\overline{A}$ is an Artinian ring and thus the chain $\mathfrak{q}^{(n)} + (x)/(x)$ stabilizes and so there is some n such that $\mathfrak{q}^{(n)} + (x) = \mathfrak{q}^{(n+1)} + (x)$. This implies:

$$\mathfrak{q}^{(n)} = \mathfrak{q}^{(n+1)} + x \, \mathfrak{q}^{(n)}$$,

from the fact $\mathfrak{q}^{(n)}$ is $\mathfrak{q}$-primary (if $y$ is in $\mathfrak{q}^{(n)}\subseteq\mathfrak{q}^{(n+1)}+(x)$, then $y = z + ax$ with $z \in \mathfrak{q}^{(n+1)}$ and $a \in A$. Since $\mathfrak{p}$ is minimal over $x$, $x \not\in \mathfrak{q}$ and so $ax \in \mathfrak{q}^{(n)}$ implies $a$ is in $\mathfrak{q}^{(n)}$.) Now, quotienting out both sides by $\mathfrak{q}^{(n+1)}$ yields $\mathfrak{q}^{(n)}/\mathfrak{q}^{(n+1)} = (x)\mathfrak{q}^{(n)}/\mathfrak{q}^{(n+1)}$. Then, by Nakayama's lemma (which says a finitely generated module M is zero if $M = IM$ for some ideal I contained in the Jacobson radical), we get $M = \mathfrak{q}^{(n)}/\mathfrak{q}^{(n+1)} = 0$; i.e., $\mathfrak{q}^{(n)} = \mathfrak{q}^{(n+1)}$ and thus $\mathfrak{q}^{n} A_{\mathfrak{q}} = \mathfrak{q}^{n+1} A_{\mathfrak{q}}$. Using Nakayama's lemma again, $\mathfrak{q}^{n} A_{\mathfrak{q}} = 0$ and $A_{\mathfrak{q}}$ is an Artinian ring; thus, the height of $\mathfrak{q}$ is zero. $\square$

=== Proof of the height theorem ===
Krull's height theorem can be proved as a consequence of the principal ideal theorem by induction on the number of elements. Let $x_1, \dots, x_n$ be elements in $A$, $\mathfrak{p}$ a minimal prime over $(x_1, \dots, x_n)$ and $\mathfrak{q} \subsetneq \mathfrak{p}$ a prime ideal such that there is no prime strictly between them. Replacing $A$ by the localization $A_{\mathfrak{p}}$ we can assume $(A, \mathfrak{p})$ is a local ring; note we then have $\mathfrak{p} = \sqrt{(x_1, \dots, x_n)}$. By minimality of $\mathfrak{p}$, it follows that $\mathfrak{q}$ cannot contain all the $x_i$; relabeling the subscripts, say, $x_1 \not\in \mathfrak{q}$. Since every prime ideal containing $\mathfrak{q} + (x_1)$ is between $\mathfrak{q}$ and $\mathfrak{p}$, $\sqrt{\mathfrak{q} + (x_1)} = \mathfrak{p}$ and thus we can write for each $i \ge 2$,

$$x_i^{r_i} = y_i + a_i x_1$$

with $y_i \in \mathfrak{q}$ and $a_i \in A$. Now we consider the ring $\overline{A} = A/(y_2, \dots, y_n)$ and the corresponding chain $\overline{\mathfrak{q}} \subset \overline{\mathfrak{p}}$ in it. If $\overline{\mathfrak{r}}$ is a minimal prime over $\overline{x_1}$, then $\mathfrak{r}$ contains $x_1, x_2^{r_2}, \dots, x_n^{r_n}$ and thus $\mathfrak{r} = \mathfrak{p}$; that is to say, $\overline{\mathfrak{p}}$ is a minimal prime over $\overline{x_1}$ and so, by Krull's principal ideal theorem, $\overline{\mathfrak{q}}$ is a minimal prime (over zero); $\mathfrak{q}$ is a minimal prime over $(y_2, \dots, y_n)$. By inductive hypothesis, $\operatorname{ht}(\mathfrak{q}) \le n-1$ and thus $\operatorname{ht}(\mathfrak{p}) \le n$. $\square$
