= Quasi-unmixed ring =

Noetherian ring in algebra

In algebra, specifically in the theory of commutative rings, a quasi-unmixed ring (also called a formally equidimensional ring in EGA) is a Noetherian ring $A$ such that for each prime ideal p, the completion of the localization A_{p} is equidimensional, i.e. for each minimal prime ideal q in the completion $\widehat{A_p}$, $\dim \widehat{A_p}/q = \dim A_p$ = the Krull dimension of A_{p}.

== Equivalent conditions ==
A Noetherian integral domain is quasi-unmixed if and only if it satisfies Nagata's altitude formula. (See also: #formally catenary ring below.)

Precisely, a quasi-unmixed ring is a ring in which the unmixed theorem, which characterizes a Cohen–Macaulay ring, holds for integral closure of an ideal; specifically, for a Noetherian ring $A$, the following are equivalent:

- $A$ is quasi-unmixed.
- For each ideal I generated by a number of elements equal to its height, the integral closure $\overline{I}$ is unmixed in height (each prime divisor has the same height as the others).
- For each ideal I generated by a number of elements equal to its height and for each integer n > 0, $\overline{I^n}$ is unmixed.

== Formally catenary ring ==
A Noetherian local ring $A$ is said to be formally catenary if for every prime ideal $\mathfrak{p}$, $A/\mathfrak{p}$ is quasi-unmixed. As it turns out, this notion is redundant: Ratliff has shown that a Noetherian local ring is formally catenary if and only if it is universally catenary.
