= Tertiary ideal =

In mathematics, a tertiary ideal is a two-sided ideal in a perhaps noncommutative ring that cannot be expressed as a nontrivial intersection of a right fractional ideal with another ideal. Tertiary ideals generalize primary ideals to the case of noncommutative rings. Although primary decompositions do not exist in general for ideals in noncommutative rings, tertiary decompositions do, at least if the ring is Noetherian.

Every primary ideal is tertiary. Tertiary ideals and primary ideals coincide for commutative rings. To any (two-sided) ideal, a tertiary ideal can be associated called the tertiary radical, defined as

$$t(I) = \{r \in R \mbox{ }|\mbox{ } \forall s \notin I, \mbox{ }\exists x \in (s)\mbox{ } x \notin I \text{ and } (x)(r) \subset I \}.$$

Then t(I) always contains I.

If R is a (not necessarily commutative) Noetherian ring and I a right ideal in R, then I has a unique irredundant decomposition into tertiary ideals

$$I = T_1 \cap \dots \cap T_n$$.
