= Assassinator =

Assassinator may refer to:

- The set of all Associated primes
- Assassination
