= Minimal prime ideal =

Minimal element in the set of prime ideals ordered by inclusion

In mathematics, especially in commutative algebra, certain prime ideals called minimal prime ideals play an important role in understanding rings and modules. The notion of height and Krull's principal ideal theorem use minimal prime ideals.

== Definition ==
A prime ideal P is said to be a minimal prime ideal over an ideal I if it is minimal among all prime ideals containing I. (Note: if I is a prime ideal, then I is the only minimal prime over it.) A prime ideal is said to be simply a minimal prime ideal if it is a minimal prime ideal over the zero ideal.

A minimal prime ideal over an ideal I in a Noetherian ring R is precisely a minimal associated prime (also called isolated prime) of $R/I$; this follows for instance from the primary decomposition of I.

== Examples ==
- In a commutative Artinian ring, every maximal ideal is a minimal prime ideal.
- In an integral domain, the only minimal prime ideal is the zero ideal.
- In the ring Z of integers, the minimal prime ideals over a nonzero principal ideal (n) are the principal ideals (p), where p is a prime divisor of n. The only minimal prime ideal over the zero ideal is the zero ideal itself. Similar statements hold for any principal ideal domain.
- If I is a p-primary ideal (for example, a symbolic power of p), then p is the unique minimal prime ideal over I.
- The ideals $(x)$ and $(y)$ are the minimal prime ideals in $\mathbb{C}[x,y]/(xy)$ since they are the extension of prime ideals for the morphism $\mathbb{C}[x,y] \to \mathbb{C}[x,y]/(xy)$, contain the zero ideal (which is not prime since $x\cdot y = 0 \in (0)$, but, neither $x$ nor $y$ are contained in the zero ideal) and are not contained in any other prime ideal.
- In $\mathbb{C}[x,y,z]$ the minimal primes over the ideal $((x^3 - y^3 - z^3)^4 (x^5 + y^5 + z^5)^3)$ are the ideals $(x^3 - y^3 - z^3)$ and $(x^5 + y^5 + z^5)$.
- Let $A = \mathbb{C}[x,y]/(x^3 y, x y^3)$ and $\overline{x}, \overline{y}$ the images of x, y in A. Then $(\overline{x})$ and $(\overline{y})$ are the minimal prime ideals of A (and there are no others). Let $D$ be the set of zero-divisors in A. Then $\overline{x} + \overline{y}$ is in D (since it kills nonzero $\overline{x}^2 \overline{y} - \overline{x}\overline{y}^2$) while neither in $(\overline{x})$ nor $(\overline{y})$; so $(\overline{x}) \cup (\overline{y}) \subsetneq D$.

== Properties ==
All rings are assumed to be commutative and unital.

- Every proper ideal I in a ring has at least one minimal prime ideal above it. The proof of this fact uses Zorn's lemma. Any maximal ideal containing I is prime, and such ideals exist, so the set of prime ideals containing I is non-empty. The intersection of a decreasing chain of prime ideals is prime. Therefore, the set of prime ideals containing I has a minimal element, which is a minimal prime over I.
- Emmy Noether showed that in a Noetherian ring, there are only finitely many minimal prime ideals over any given ideal. The fact remains true if "Noetherian" is replaced by the ascending chain conditions on radical ideals.
- The radical $\sqrt{I}$ of any proper ideal I coincides with the intersection of the minimal prime ideals over I. This follows from the fact that every prime ideal contains a minimal prime ideal.
- The set of zero divisors of a given ring contains the union of the minimal prime ideals.
- Krull's principal ideal theorem says that, in a Noetherian ring, each minimal prime over a principal ideal has height at most one.
- Each proper ideal I of a Noetherian ring contains a product of the possibly repeated minimal prime ideals over it (Proof: $\sqrt{I} = \bigcap_i^r \mathfrak{p}_i$ is the intersection of the minimal prime ideals over I. For some n, $\sqrt{I}^n \subset I$ and so I contains $\prod_1^r \mathfrak{p}_i^n$.)
- A prime ideal $\mathfrak{p}$ in a ring R is a unique minimal prime over an ideal I if and only if $\sqrt{I} = \mathfrak{p}$, and such an I is $\mathfrak{p}$-primary if $\mathfrak{p}$ is maximal. This gives a local criterion for a minimal prime: a prime ideal $\mathfrak{p}$ is a minimal prime over I if and only if $I R_{\mathfrak{p}}$ is a $\mathfrak{p} R_{\mathfrak{p}}$-primary ideal. When R is a Noetherian ring, $\mathfrak{p}$ is a minimal prime over I if and only if $R_{\mathfrak{p}}/I R_{\mathfrak{p}}$ is an Artinian ring (i.e., $\mathfrak{p} R_{\mathfrak{p}}$ is nilpotent module I). The pre-image of $I R_{\mathfrak{p}}$ under $R \to R_{\mathfrak{p}}$ is a primary ideal of $R$ called the $\mathfrak{p}$-primary component of I.
- When $A$ is Noetherian local, with maximal ideal $P$, $P\supseteq I$ is minimal over $I$ if and only if there exists a number $m$ such that $P^m\subseteq I$.

== Equidimensional ring ==
For a minimal prime ideal $\mathfrak{p}$ in a local ring $A$, in general, it need not be the case that $\dim A/\mathfrak{p} = \dim A$, the Krull dimension of $A$.

A Noetherian local ring $A$ is said to be equidimensional if for each minimal prime ideal $\mathfrak{p}$, $\dim A/\mathfrak{p} = \dim A$. For example, a local Noetherian integral domain and a local Cohen–Macaulay ring are equidimensional.

See also equidimensional scheme and quasi-unmixed ring.

== See also ==
- Extension and contraction of ideals
- Normalization
