= Semiprime ring =

Generalizations of prime ideals and prime rings

A Hasse diagram of a portion of the lattice of ideals of the integers Z. The purple and green nodes indicate semiprime ideals. The purple nodes are prime ideals, and the purple and blue nodes are primary ideals.

In ring theory, a branch of mathematics, semiprime ideals and semiprime rings are generalizations of prime ideals and prime rings. In commutative algebra, semiprime ideals are also called radical ideals and semiprime rings are the same as reduced rings.

For example, in the ring of integers, the semiprime ideals are the zero ideal, along with those ideals of the form $n\mathbb Z$ where n is a square-free integer. So, $30\mathbb Z$ is a semiprime ideal of the integers (because 30 = 2 × 3 × 5, with no repeated prime factors), but $12\mathbb Z\,$ is not (because 12 = 2^{2} × 3, with a repeated prime factor).

The class of semiprime rings includes semiprimitive rings, prime rings and reduced rings.

Most definitions and assertions in this article appear in (Lam 1999) and (Lam 2001).

== Definitions ==
For a commutative ring R, a proper ideal A is a semiprime ideal if A satisfies either of the following equivalent conditions:

- If x^{k} is in A for some positive integer k and element x of R, then x is in A.
- If y is in R but not in A, all positive integer powers of y are not in A.

The latter condition that the complement is "closed under powers" is analogous to the fact that complements of prime ideals are closed under multiplication.

As with prime ideals, this is extended to noncommutative rings "ideal-wise". The following conditions are equivalent definitions for a semiprime ideal A in a ring R:

- For any ideal J of R, if J^{k}⊆A for a positive natural number k, then J⊆A.
- For any right ideal J of R, if J^{k}⊆A for a positive natural number k, then J⊆A.
- For any left ideal J of R, if J^{k}⊆A for a positive natural number k, then J⊆A.
- For any x in R, if xRx⊆A, then x is in A.

Here again, there is a noncommutative analogue of prime ideals as complements of m-systems. A nonempty subset S of a ring R is called an n-system if for any s in S, there exists an r in R such that srs is in S. With this notion, an additional equivalent point may be added to the above list:

- R\A is an n-system.

The ring R is called a semiprime ring if the zero ideal is a semiprime ideal. In the commutative case, this is equivalent to R being a reduced ring, since R has no nonzero nilpotent elements. In the noncommutative case, the ring merely has no nonzero nilpotent right ideals. So while a reduced ring is always semiprime, the converse is not true.

== General properties of semiprime ideals ==
To begin with, it is clear that prime ideals are semiprime, and that for commutative rings, a semiprime primary ideal is prime.

While the intersection of prime ideals is not usually prime, it is a semiprime ideal. Shortly it will be shown that the converse is also true, that every semiprime ideal is the intersection of a family of prime ideals.

For any ideal B in a ring R, we can form the following sets:

$$\sqrt{B}:=\bigcap\{ P\subseteq R \mid B \subseteq P, P \mbox{ a prime ideal} \}\subseteq\{x\in R\mid x^n\in B \mbox{ for some }n\in\mathbb{N}^+  \} \,$$

The set $\sqrt{B}$ is the definition of the radical of B and is clearly a semiprime ideal containing B, and in fact is the smallest semiprime ideal containing B. The inclusion above is sometimes proper in the general case, but for commutative rings it becomes an equality.

With this definition, an ideal A is semiprime if and only if $\sqrt{A}=A$. At this point, it is also apparent that every semiprime ideal is in fact the intersection of a family of prime ideals. Moreover, this shows that the intersection of any two semiprime ideals is again semiprime.

By definition R is semiprime if and only if $\sqrt{\{0\}}=\{0\}$, that is, the intersection of all prime ideals is zero. This ideal $\sqrt{\{0\}}$ is also denoted by $Nil_*(R)\,$ and also called Baer's lower nilradical or the Baer-Mccoy radical or the prime radical of R.

== Semiprime Goldie rings ==
A right Goldie ring is a ring that has finite uniform dimension (also called finite rank) as a right module over itself, and satisfies the ascending chain condition on right annihilators of its subsets. Goldie's theorem states that the semiprime right Goldie rings are precisely those that have a semisimple Artinian right classical ring of quotients. The Artin–Wedderburn theorem then completely determines the structure of this ring of quotients.
