= Catenary (disambiguation) =

Catenary is a mathematical curve.

Catenary may also refer to:

== Mathematics ==
- Catenary arch, an arch that follows a catenary curve
- Catenary ring, a type of mathematical ring

== Other uses ==
- Overhead catenary, another name for the overhead line system for electric power transmission for railways
