= Symbolic power of an ideal =

In algebra and algebraic geometry, given a commutative Noetherian ring $R$ and an ideal $I$ in it, the n-th symbolic power of $I$ is the ideal

$$I^{(n)} = \bigcap_{\mathfrak p\in \operatorname{Ass}(R/I)} \varphi_{\mathfrak p}^{-1}(I^n R_{\mathfrak p})$$

where $R_{\mathfrak p}$ is the localization of $R$ at $\mathfrak p$, we set $\varphi_{\mathfrak p}\colon R \to R_{\mathfrak p}$ is the canonical map from a ring to its localization, and the intersection runs through all of the associated primes of $R/I$.

Though this definition does not require $I$ to be prime, this assumption is often worked with because in the case of a prime ideal, the symbolic power can be equivalently defined as the $I$-primary component of $I^n$. Very roughly, it consists of functions with zeros of order $n$ along the variety defined by $I$. We have: $I^{(1)} = I$ and if $I$ is a maximal ideal, then $I^{(n)} = I^n$.

Symbolic powers induce the following chain of ideals:

$$I^{(0)}=R\supset I=I^{(1)}\supset I^{(2)}\supset I^{(3)}\supset I^{(4)}\supset \cdots$$

== Uses ==
The study and use of symbolic powers has a long history in commutative algebra. Krull's famous proof of his principal ideal theorem uses them in an essential way. They first arose after primary decompositions were proved for Noetherian rings. Zariski used symbolic powers in his study of the analytic normality of algebraic varieties. Chevalley's famous lemma comparing topologies states that in a complete local domain the symbolic powers topology of any prime is finer than the m-adic topology. A crucial step in the vanishing theorem on local cohomology of Hartshorne and Lichtenbaum uses that for a prime $I$ defining a curve in a complete local domain, the powers of $I$ are cofinal with the symbolic powers of $I$. This important property of being cofinal was further developed by Schenzel in the 1970s.

== In algebraic geometry ==
Though generators for ordinary powers of $I$ are well understood when $I$ is given in terms of its generators as $I = (f_1, \ldots, f_k)$, it is still very difficult in many cases to determine the generators of symbolic powers of $I$. But in the geometric setting, there is a clear geometric interpretation in the case when $I$ is a radical ideal over an algebraically closed field of characteristic zero.

If $X$ is an irreducible variety whose ideal of vanishing is $I$, then the differential power of $I$ consists of all the functions in $R$ that vanish to order ≥ n on $X$, i.e.

$$I^{\langle n\rangle} := \{ f \in R \mid f \text{ vanishes to order} \geq n \text{ on all of }X \}.$$

Or equivalently, if $\mathbf{m}_p$ is the maximal ideal for a point $p\in X$, $I^{\langle n\rangle}=\bigcap _{p \in X} \mathbf{m}_p^n$.

Theorem (Nagata, Zariski) Let $I$ be a prime ideal in a polynomial ring $K[x_1, \ldots , x_N ]$ over an algebraically closed field. Then

$$I^{(m)}=I^{\langle m\rangle}$$

This result can be extended to any radical ideal. This formulation is very useful because, in characteristic zero, we can compute the differential powers in terms of generators as:

$$I^{\langle m\rangle}=\left\langle f \mid \frac{\partial^\mathbf{a}f}{\partial x^\mathbf{a}}\in I \text{ for all }\mathbf{a}\in \mathbb{N}
^N \text{ where }|\mathbf{a}|=\sum_{i=1}^N a_i\leq m-1 \right\rangle$$

For another formulation, we can consider the case when the base ring is a polynomial ring over a field. In this case, we can interpret the n-th symbolic power as the sheaf of all function germs over $X = \operatorname{Spec}(R) \text{ vanishing to order} \geq n \text{ at } Z=V(I)$ In fact, if $X$ is a smooth variety over a perfect field, then

$I^ {(n)} = \{f \in R \mid f \in \mathbf{m}^ n \text{ for every closed point }\mathbf{m} \in Z\}$

== Containments ==
It is natural to consider whether or not symbolic powers agree with ordinary powers, i.e. does $I^n=I^{(n)}$ hold? In general this is not the case. One example of this is the prime ideal $P =(x^4-yz,\, y^2-xz, \,x^3y-z^2) \subseteq K[x,y,z]$. Here we have that $P^2\neq P^{(2)}$. However, $P^2\subset P^{(2)}$ does hold and the generalization of this inclusion is well understood. Indeed, the containment $I^n\subseteq I^{(n)}$follows from the definition. Further, it is known that $I^r\subseteq I^{(m)}$ if and only if $m\leq r$. The proof follows from Nakayama's lemma.

There has been extensive study into the other containment, when symbolic powers are contained in ordinary powers of ideals, referred to as the Containment Problem. Once again this has an easily stated answer summarized in the following theorem. It was developed by Ein, Lazarfeld, and Smith in characteristic zero and was expanded to positive characteristic by Hochster and Huneke. Their papers both build upon the results of Irena Swanson in Linear Equivalence of Ideal Topologies (2000).

Theorem (Ein, Lazarfeld, Smith; Hochster, Huneke) Let $I\subset K[x_1,x_2,\ldots,x_N]$ be a homogeneous ideal. Then the inclusion

$I^{(m)}\subset I^r$ holds for all $m\geq Nr.$

It was later verified that the bound of $N$ in the theorem cannot be tightened for general ideals. However, following a question posed by Bocci, Harbourne, and Huneke, it was discovered that a better bound exists in some cases.

Theorem The inclusion $I^{(m)}\subseteq I^r$ for all $m\geq Nr-N+1$ holds

1. for arbitrary ideals in characteristic 2;
2. for monomial ideals in arbitrary characteristic
3. for ideals of d-stars
4. for ideals of general points in $\mathbb{P}^ 2 \text{ and }\mathbb{P}^ 3$
