= Hilbert–Samuel function =

In commutative algebra the Hilbert–Samuel function, named after David Hilbert and Pierre Samuel, of a nonzero finitely generated module $M$ over a commutative Noetherian local ring $A$ and a primary ideal $I$ of $A$ is the map $\chi_{M}^{I}:\mathbb{N}\rightarrow\mathbb{N}$ such that, for all $n\in\mathbb{N}$,

$$\chi_{M}^{I}(n)=\ell(M/I^{n}M)$$

where $\ell$ denotes the length over $A$. It is related to the Hilbert function of the associated graded module $\operatorname{gr}_I(M)$ by the identity

$$\chi_M^I (n)=\sum_{i=0}^n H(\operatorname{gr}_I(M),i).$$

For sufficiently large $n$, it coincides with a polynomial function of degree equal to $\dim(\operatorname{gr}_I(M))$, often called the Hilbert-Samuel polynomial (or Hilbert polynomial).

== Examples ==
For the ring of formal power series in two variables $k[[x,y]]$ taken as a module over itself and the ideal $I$ generated by the monomials x^{2} and y^{3} we have

$\chi(1)=6,\quad \chi(2)=18,\quad \chi(3)=36,\quad \chi(4)=60,\text{ and in general } \chi(n)=3n(n+1)\text{ for }n \geq 0.$

== Degree bounds ==
Unlike the Hilbert function, the Hilbert–Samuel function is not additive on an exact sequence. However, it is still reasonably close to being additive, as a consequence of the Artin–Rees lemma. We denote by $P_{I, M}$ the Hilbert-Samuel polynomial; i.e., it coincides with the Hilbert–Samuel function for large integers.

Theorem—Let $(R, m)$ be a Noetherian local ring and I an m-primary ideal. If

$$0 \to M' \to M \to M'' \to 0$$

is an exact sequence of finitely generated R-modules and if $M/I M$ has finite length, then we have:

$$P_{I, M} = P_{I, M'} + P_{I, M''} - F$$

where F is a polynomial of degree strictly less than that of $P_{I, M'}$ and having positive leading coefficient. In particular, if $M' \simeq M$, then the degree of $P_{I, M''}$ is strictly less than that of $P_{I, M} = P_{I, M'}$.

Proof: Tensoring the given exact sequence with $R/I^n$ and computing the kernel we get the exact sequence:

$$0 \to (I^n M \cap M')/I^n M' \to M'/I^n M' \to M/I^n M \to M''/I^n M'' \to 0,$$

which gives us:

$$\chi_M^I(n-1) = \chi_{M'}^I(n-1) + \chi_{M''}^I(n-1) - \ell((I^n M \cap M')/I^n M')$$.

The third term on the right can be estimated by Artin-Rees. Indeed, by the lemma, for large n and some k,

$$I^n M \cap M' = I^{n-k} ((I^k M) \cap M') \subset I^{n-k} M'.$$

Thus,

$$\ell((I^n M \cap M') / I^n M') \le \chi^I_{M'}(n-1) - \chi^I_{M'}(n-k-1)$$.

This gives the desired degree bound.

== Multiplicity ==
If $A$ is a local ring of Krull dimension $d$, with $m$-primary ideal $I$, its Hilbert polynomial has leading term of the form $\frac{e}{d!}\cdot n^d$ for some integer $e$. This integer $e$ is called the multiplicity of the ideal $I$. When $I=m$ is the maximal ideal of $A$, one also says $e$ is the multiplicity of the local ring $A$.

The multiplicity of a point $x$ of a scheme $X$ is defined to be the multiplicity of the corresponding local ring $\mathcal{O}_{X,x}$.

== See also ==
- j-multiplicity
