= J-multiplicity =

In algebra, a j-multiplicity is a generalization of a Hilbert–Samuel multiplicity. For m-primary ideals, the two notions coincide.

== Definition ==
Let $(R, \mathfrak{m})$ be a local Noetherian ring of Krull dimension $d > 0$. Then the j-multiplicity of an ideal I is

$$j(I) = j(\operatorname{gr}_I R)$$

where $j(\operatorname{gr}_I R)$ is the normalized coefficient of the degree d − 1 term in the Hilbert polynomial $\Gamma_\mathfrak{m}(\operatorname{gr}_I R)$; $\Gamma_\mathfrak{m}$ means the space of sections supported at $\mathfrak{m}$.
