= Real radical =

Largest ideal with the same vanishing locus

In algebra, the real radical of an ideal I in a polynomial ring with real coefficients is the largest ideal containing I with the same (real) vanishing locus. It plays a similar role in real algebraic geometry that the radical of an ideal plays in algebraic geometry over an algebraically closed field. More specifically, Hilbert's Nullstellensatz says that when I is an ideal in a polynomial ring with coefficients coming from an algebraically closed field, the radical of I is the set of polynomials vanishing on the vanishing locus of I. In real algebraic geometry, the Nullstellensatz fails as the real numbers are not algebraically closed. However, one can recover a similar theorem, the real Nullstellensatz, by using the real radical in place of the (ordinary) radical.

== Definition ==
The real radical of an ideal I in a polynomial ring $\mathbb{R}[x_1,\dots,x_n]$ over the real numbers, denoted by $\sqrt[\mathbb{R}]{I}$, is defined as

The Positivstellensatz then implies that $\sqrt[\mathbb{R}]{I}$ is the set of all polynomials that vanish on the real variety (Note: that is, the set of the points with real coordinates of a variety defined by polynomials with real coefficients) defined by the vanishing of $I$.
