= Deviation of a poset =

In order-theoretic mathematics, the deviation of a poset is an ordinal number measuring the complexity of a poset. A poset is also known as a partially ordered set.

The deviation of a poset is used to define the Krull dimension of a module over a ring as the deviation of its poset of submodules.

== Definition ==
A trivial poset (one in which no two distinct elements are comparable) is declared to have deviation $-\infty$. A nontrivial poset satisfying the descending chain condition is said to have deviation 0. Then, inductively, a poset is said to have deviation at most α (for an ordinal α) if for every descending chain of elements a_{0} > a_{1} >... all but a finite number of the posets of elements between a_{n} and a_{n+1} have deviation less than α. The deviation (if it exists) is the minimum value of α for which this is true.

Not every poset has a deviation. The following conditions on a poset are equivalent:

- The poset has a deviation
- The opposite poset has a deviation
- The poset does not contain a subset order-isomorphic to the rational numbers (with their standard numerical ordering)

== Examples ==
The poset of positive integers has deviation 0: every descending chain is finite, so the defining condition for deviation is vacuously true. However, its opposite poset has deviation 1.

Let k be an algebraically closed field and consider the poset of ideals of the polynomial ring k[x] in one variable. Since the deviation of this poset is the Krull dimension of the ring, we know that it should be 1. This corresponds to the fact that k[x] does not have the descending chain condition (so the deviation is greater than zero), but in any descending chain, consecutive elements are 'close together'. For instance, take the descending chain of ideals $(x)\supset (x^2)\supset (x^3)\supset...$ - this is an infinite descending chain, but for any two consecutive terms, say $(x^n)$ and $(x^{n+1})$, there is no infinite descending chain of ideals of k[x] contained between these terms.

Extending this example further, consider the polynomial ring in two variables, k[x,y], which has Krull dimension 2. Take the descending chain $(x)\supset (x^2)\supset(x^3)\supset...$. Given any two adjacent terms in this chain, $(x^n)$ and $(x^{n+1})$, there is an infinite descending chain $(x^ny,x^{n+1})\supset(x^ny^2,x^{n+1})\supset(x^ny^3,x^{n+1})\supset...$. So we can find a descending chain such that between any two adjacent terms there is a further infinite descending chain - we can 'nest' descending chains two layers deep. Extending this, it is easy to see that in the polynomial ring in n variables, it is possible to nest descending chains n layers deep and no more. This is essentially what it means for the poset of ideals to have deviation n.
