= Support of a module =

In commutative algebra, the support of a module M over a commutative ring R is the set of all prime ideals $\mathfrak{p}$ of R such that $M_\mathfrak{p} \ne 0$ (that is, the localization of M at $\mathfrak{p}$ is not equal to zero). It is denoted by $\operatorname{Supp}M$. The support is, by definition, a subset of the spectrum of R.

== Properties ==
- $M = 0$ if and only if its support is empty.
- Let $0 \to M' \to M \to M'' \to 0$ be a short exact sequence of R-modules. Then
  $$\operatorname{Supp}M = \operatorname{Supp}M' \cup \operatorname{Supp}M''.$$

Note that this union may not be a disjoint union.

- If $M$ is a sum of submodules $M_\lambda$, then $\operatorname{Supp}M = \bigcup_\lambda \operatorname{Supp}M_\lambda.$
- If $M$ is a finitely generated R-module, then $\operatorname{Supp}M$ is the set of all prime ideals containing the annihilator of M. In particular, it is closed in the Zariski topology on Spec R.
- If $M, N$ are finitely generated R-modules, then
  $$\operatorname{Supp}(M \otimes_R N) = \operatorname{Supp}M \cap \operatorname{Supp}N.$$
- If $M$ is a finitely generated R-module and I is an ideal of R, then $\operatorname{Supp}(M/IM)$ is the set of all prime ideals containing $I + \operatorname{Ann}M.$ This is $V(I) \cap \operatorname{Supp}M$.

== Support of a quasicoherent sheaf ==
If F is a quasicoherent sheaf on a scheme X, the support of F is the set of all points x in X such that the stalk F_{x} is nonzero. This definition is similar to the definition of the support of a function on a space X, and this is the motivation for using the word "support". Most properties of the support generalize from modules to quasicoherent sheaves word for word. For example, the support of a coherent sheaf (or more generally, a finite type sheaf) is a closed subspace of X.

If M is a module over a ring R, then the support of M as a module coincides with the support of the associated quasicoherent sheaf $\tilde{M}$ on the affine scheme Spec R. Moreover, if $\{ U_\alpha = \operatorname{Spec}(R_\alpha) \}$ is an affine cover of a scheme X, then the support of a quasicoherent sheaf F is equal to the union of supports of the associated modules M_{α} over each R_{α}.

== Examples ==
As noted above, a prime ideal $\mathfrak{p}$ is in the support if and only if it contains the annihilator of $M$. For example, over $R = \mathbb{C}[x,y,z,w]$, the annihilator of the module

$$M = R/I = \frac{\mathbb{C}[x,y,z,w]}{(x^4 + y^4 + z^4 + w^4)}$$

is the ideal $I = (f) = (x^4+ y^4 + z^4 + w^4)$. This implies that $\operatorname{Supp}M \cong \operatorname{Spec}(R/I)$, the vanishing locus of the polynomial f. Looking at the short exact sequence

$$0 \to I \to R \to R/I \to 0$$

we might mistakenly conjecture that the support of I = (f) is Spec(R_{(f)}), which is the complement of the vanishing locus of the polynomial f. In fact, since R is an integral domain, the ideal I = (f) = Rf is isomorphic to R as a module, so its support is the entire space: Supp(I) = Spec(R).

The support of a finite module over a Noetherian ring is always closed under specialization.

Now, if we take two polynomials $f_1,f_2 \in R$ in an integral domain which form a complete intersection ideal $(f_1,f_2)$, the tensor property shows us that

$$\operatorname{Supp}\left( R/(f_1)\otimes_R R/(f_2) \right) =\, \operatorname{Supp}\left( R/(f_1)\right) \cap\, \operatorname{Supp}\left( R/(f_2)\right) \cong\, \operatorname{Spec}(R/(f_1,f_2)).$$

== See also ==
- Annihilator (ring theory)
- Associated prime
- Support (mathematics)
