= Bass number =

In mathematics, the ith Bass number of a module M over a local ring R with residue field k is the k-dimension of $\operatorname{Ext}^i_R(k,M)$. More generally the Bass number $\mu_i(p,M)$ of a module M over a ring R at a prime ideal p is the Bass number of the localization of M for the localization of R (with respect to the prime p). Bass numbers were introduced by Hyman Bass (1963, p.11).

The Bass numbers describe the minimal injective resolution of a finitely-generated module M over a Noetherian ring: for each prime ideal p there is a corresponding indecomposable injective module, and the number of times this occurs in the ith term of a minimal resolution of M is the Bass number $\mu_i(p,M)$.
