= Primal ideal =

In mathematics, an element a of a commutative ring R is called (relatively) prime to an ideal I if whenever ab is an element of I then b is also an element of I.

A proper ideal I of a commutative ring A is said to be primal if the elements that are not prime to it form an ideal.
