= Radical of an ideal =

Concept in algebra

In ring theory, a branch of mathematics, the radical of an ideal $I$ of a commutative ring is another ideal defined by the property that an element $x$ is in the radical if and only if some power of $x$ is in $I$. Taking the radical of an ideal is called radicalization. A radical ideal (or semiprime ideal or reduced ideal) is an ideal that is equal to its radical. The radical of a primary ideal is a prime ideal.

This concept is generalized to non-commutative rings in the semiprime ring article.

== Definition ==
The radical (occasionally also called the nilradical) of an ideal $I$ in a commutative ring $R$, denoted by $\operatorname{rad}(I)$ or $\sqrt{I}$, is defined as

$$\sqrt{I} = \left\{r\in R \mid r^n\in I\ \hbox{for some}\ n \in \Z^{+}\!\right\},$$

(note that $I \subseteq \sqrt{I}$). Intuitively, $\sqrt{I}$ is obtained by taking all roots of elements of $I$ within the ring $R$. Equivalently, $\sqrt{I}$ is the preimage of the ideal of nilpotent elements (the nilradical of the ring) of the quotient ring $R/I$ (via the natural map $\pi\colon R\to R/I$). The latter proves that $\sqrt{I}$ is an ideal. (Note: Here is a direct proof that $\sqrt{I}$ is an ideal. Start with $a,b\in\sqrt{I}$ with some powers $a^n,b^m \in I$. To show that $a+b\in\sqrt{I}$, we use the binomial theorem (which holds for any commutative ring): $$\textstyle (a+b)^{n+m-1}=\sum_{i=0}^{n+m-1}\binom{n+m-1}{i}a^ib^{n+m-1-i}.$$ For each $i$, we have either $i\geq n$ or $n+m-1-i\geq m$. Thus, in each term $a^i b^{n+m-1-i}$, one of the exponents will be large enough to make that factor lie in $I$. Since any element of $I$ times an element of $R$ lies in $I$ (as $I$ is an ideal), this term lies in $I$. Hence $(a+b)^{n+m-1} \in I$, and so $a+b\in\sqrt{I}$. To finish checking that the radical is an ideal, take $a\in\sqrt{I}$ with $a^n\in I$, and any $r \in R$. Then $(ra)^n=r^na^n\in I$, so $ra\in\sqrt{I}$. Thus the radical is an ideal.)

If the radical of $I$ is finitely generated, then some power of $\sqrt{I}$ is contained in $I$. In particular, if $I$ and $J$ are ideals of a Noetherian ring, then $I$ and $J$ have the same radical if and only if $I$ contains some power of $J$ and $J$ contains some power of $I$.

If an ideal $I$ coincides with its own radical, then $I$ is called a radical ideal or semiprime ideal.

== Examples ==
- Consider the ring $\Z$ of integers.
  1. The radical of the ideal $4\Z$ of integer multiples of $4$ is $2\Z$ (the evens).
  2. The radical of $5\Z$ is $5\Z$.
  3. The radical of $12\Z$ is $6\Z$.
  4. In general, the radical of $m\Z$ is $r\Z$, where $r$ is the product of all distinct prime factors of $m$, the largest square-free factor of $m$ (see Radical of an integer). In fact, this generalizes to an arbitrary ideal (see the Properties section).
- Consider the ideal $I = \left(y^4\right) \subseteq \Complex[x,y]$. It is trivial to show $\sqrt{I}=(y)$ (using the basic property $\sqrt{I^n} = \sqrt{I}$), but we give some alternative methods: The radical $\sqrt{I}$ corresponds to the nilradical $\sqrt{0}$ of the quotient ring $R = \Complex[x,y]/\!\left(y^4\right)$, which is the intersection of all prime ideals of the quotient ring. This is contained in the Jacobson radical, which is the intersection of all maximal ideals, which are the kernels of homomorphisms to fields. Any ring homomorphism $R \to \Complex$ must have $y$ in the kernel in order to have a well-defined homomorphism (if we said, for example, that the kernel should be $(x,y-1)$ the composition of $\Complex[x,y] \to R \to \Complex$ would be $\left(x, y^4, y-1\right)$, which is the same as trying to force $1=0$). Since $\Complex$ is algebraically closed, every homomorphism $R \to \mathbb{F}$ must factor through $\Complex$, so we only have to compute the intersection of $\{\ker(\Phi) : \Phi \in \operatorname{Hom}(R,\Complex) \}$ to compute the radical of $(0).$ We then find that $\sqrt{0} = (y) \subseteq R.$

== Properties ==
This section will continue the convention that $I$ is an ideal of a commutative ring $R$:

- It is always true that $\sqrt{\sqrt{I}} = \sqrt{I}$, i.e. radicalization is an idempotent operation. Moreover, $\sqrt{I}$ is the smallest radical ideal containing $I$.
- $\sqrt{I}$ is the intersection of all the prime ideals of $R$ that contain $I$
  $$\sqrt{I}=\bigcap_{\stackrel{\mathfrak{p}\text{ prime}}{R\supsetneq\mathfrak{p}\supseteq I}}\mathfrak{p},$$
  and thus the radical of a prime ideal is equal to itself. (Note: Proof: On one hand, every prime ideal is radical, and so this intersection contains $\sqrt{I}.$ On the other hand, suppose $r$ is an element of $R$ that is not in $\sqrt{I},$ and let $S$ be the set $\left\{r^n \mid n = 0, 1, 2, \dots \right\}.$ By the definition of $\sqrt{I},$ $S$ must be disjoint from $I,$ and $S$ is also multiplicatively closed. Thus, by a variant of Krull's theorem, there exists a prime ideal $\mathfrak{p}$ that contains $I$ but disjoint from $S$ (see: Prime ideal and Zorn's lemma). Since $\mathfrak{p}$ contains $I,$ but not $r,$ this shows that $r$ is not in the intersection of prime ideals containing $I,$ Q.E.D.) (Note: The statement may be strengthened a bit: the radical of $I$ is the intersection of all prime ideals of $R$ that are minimal among those containing $I$.)
- Specializing the last point, the nilradical (the set of all nilpotent elements) is equal to the intersection of all prime ideals of $R$ (Note: For a direct proof, see also the characterisation of the nilradical of a ring.)
  $$\sqrt{0} = \mathfrak{N}_R = \bigcap_{\mathfrak{p}\subsetneq R\text{ prime}}\mathfrak{p}.$$
  This property is seen to be equivalent to the former via the natural map $\pi\colon R\to R/I$, which yields a bijection $u$:
  $$\left\lbrace\text{ideals }J\mid R\supseteq J\supseteq I\right\rbrace
\quad {\overset{u}{\rightleftarrows}} \quad
\left\lbrace\text{ideals }J\mid J\subseteq R/I\right\rbrace,$$
  defined by $u \colon J\mapsto J/I=\lbrace r+I\mid r\in J\rbrace.$ (Note: This fact is known as the fourth isomorphism theorem (or correspondence theorem, or lattice theorem).)
- An ideal $I$ in a ring $R$ is radical if and only if the quotient ring $R/I$ is reduced.
- The radical of a homogeneous ideal is homogeneous.
- The radical of an intersection of ideals is equal to the intersection of their radicals: $\sqrt{I \cap J} = \sqrt{I} \cap \sqrt{J}$.
- The radical of a primary ideal is prime. If the radical of an ideal $I$ is maximal, then $I$ is primary.
- If $I$ is an ideal, $\sqrt{I^n} = \sqrt{I}$. Since prime ideals are radical ideals, $\sqrt{\mathfrak{p}} = \mathfrak{p}$ for any prime ideal $\mathfrak{p}$.
- Let $I,J$ be ideals of a ring $R$. If $\sqrt{I}, \sqrt{J}$ are comaximal, then $I, J$ are comaximal. (Note: Proof: $R = \sqrt{\sqrt{I} + \sqrt{J} } = \sqrt{I + J}$ implies $I + J = R$.)
- Let $M$ be a finitely generated module over a Noetherian ring $R$. Then
  $$\sqrt{\operatorname{ann}_R(M)} = \bigcap_{\mathfrak{p} \,\in\, \operatorname{supp}M} \mathfrak{p} = \bigcap_{\mathfrak{p} \,\in\, \operatorname{ass}M} \mathfrak{p}$$
  where $\operatorname{supp}M$ is the support of $M$ and $\operatorname{ass}M$ is the set of associated primes of $M$.

== Applications to algebraic geometry ==
One of the primary motivations for studying radicals of ideals is to understand algebraic sets and varieties in algebraic geometry.

For a subset of polynomials $S\subset \mathbb{k}[x_1,\dots,x_n]$ and subset of points $X\subset \mathbb{k}^n,$ where $\mathbb{k}$ is an algebraically closed field, let

$$\operatorname{V}(S) := \left\{x \in \mathbb{k}^n \mid f(x)=0 \mbox{ for all } f \in S\right\}$$

and

$$\operatorname{I}(X) := \{f \in \mathbb{k}[x_1, \dots, x_n] \mid f(x)=0 \mbox{ for all } x \in X \}$$

be the zero locus (or 'variety') of S and vanishing ideal (or 'ideal') of X, respectively.

If $S\subset\mathbb{k}[x_1,\dots,x_n]$ is any subset of polynomials, $(S)$ is the ideal generated by the elements of S, and $\sqrt{(S)}$ is the radical of that ideal, then these collections of polynomials have the same zero loci:

$$\operatorname{V}(S)=\operatorname{V}
((S))=\operatorname{V}(\sqrt{(S)}).$$

Moreover, the vanishing ideal of any $X\subset \mathbb{k}^n$ is always a radical ideal:

$$\operatorname{I}(X)=\sqrt{\operatorname{I}(X)}.$$

The operations V and I are, in a sense made more precise below, inverses of each other:

For any subset of points $X\subset \mathbb{k}^n$,

$$\operatorname{V}(\operatorname{I}(X))=\overline{X},$$

where $\overline{X}$ is the closure of X in the Zariski topology. In particular, $\operatorname{V}(\operatorname{I}(X))=X$ if X is an algebraic set, since algebraic sets are closed in the Zariski topology.

Hilbert's Nullstellensatz is a fundamental result in commutative algebra and algebraic geometry that addresses the composition of V and I in the opposite order. One version of this celebrated theorem states that for any subset of polynomials $S\subset \mathbb{k}[x_1,\dots,x_n],$ we have

$$\operatorname{I}(\operatorname{V}(S)) = \sqrt{(S)}.$$

Geometrically, this says that if an affine algebraic set W is cut out by the polynomial equations $f_1(x)=0,\dots,f_m(x)=0,$ then the polynomials f that vanish on W are precisely those such that one of the powers of f lies in the ideal generated by the polynomials $f_1,\dots,f_m;$ i.e., $f^r\in (f_1,\ldots,f_m)$ for some natural number r. As a corollary, $\operatorname{I}(\operatorname{V}(J)) = J$ if J is a radical ideal.

It is clear that both V and I reverse the direction of inclusions: $S_1\subset S_2 \implies \operatorname{V}(S_1)\supset\operatorname{V}(S_2)$ and $X_1\subset X_2 \implies \operatorname{I}(X_1)\supset\operatorname{I}(X_2).$ Consequently, $X \subset \operatorname{V}(S) \iff S \subset \operatorname{I}(X),$ and so V and I form an antitone Galois connection between subsets of polynomials in $\mathbb{k}[x_1,\dots,x_n]$ and subsets of points in $\mathbb{k}^n$ that gives rise to a bijective correspondence when restricted to radical ideals and algebraic sets:

$$\{\mathrm{radical\ ideals}\subset \mathbb{k}[x_1,\dots,x_n]\}\ \underset{\operatorname{I}}{\stackrel{\operatorname{V}}{\rightleftarrows}}\  \{\mathrm{algebraic\ sets}\subset \mathbb{k}^n\}.$$

== See also ==
- Jacobson radical
- Nilradical of a ring
- Real radical
