= Primary ideal =

Concept in commutative algebra

In mathematics, specifically commutative algebra, a proper ideal $\mathfrak q$ of a commutative ring $A$ is said to be primary if whenever $xy$ is an element of $\mathfrak q$ then $x$ or $y^n$ is also an element of $\mathfrak q$, for some $n>0$. For example, in the ring of integers $\mathbb Z$, $(p^n)$ is a primary ideal if $p$ is a prime number.

The notion of primary ideals is important in commutative ring theory because every ideal of a Noetherian ring has a primary decomposition, that is, can be written as an intersection of finitely many primary ideals. This result is known as the Lasker–Noether theorem. Consequently, an irreducible ideal of a Noetherian ring is primary.

Various methods of generalizing primary ideals to noncommutative rings exist, but the topic is most often studied for commutative rings. Therefore, the rings in this article are assumed to be commutative rings with identity.

== Examples and properties ==
- The definition can be rephrased in a more apparently symmetrical manner: a proper ideal $\mathfrak{q}$ is primary if, whenever $x y \in \mathfrak{q}$, $x$ or $y$ are elements of $\mathfrak{q}$, or both $x$ and $y$ lie in $\sqrt{\mathfrak{q}}$, the radical of $\mathfrak{q}$; i.e., $xy\in\mathfrak{q}\implies(x\in\mathfrak{q})\lor(y\in\mathfrak{q})\lor((x\in\sqrt{\mathfrak{q}})\land (y\in\sqrt{\mathfrak{q}})).$
- A proper ideal ${\mathfrak q}$ of $R$ is primary if and only if every zero divisor in $R/{\mathfrak q}$ is nilpotent. (Compare this to the case of prime ideals, where ${\mathfrak p}$ is prime if and only if every zero divisor in $R/{\mathfrak p}$ is actually zero.)
- Any prime ideal is primary, and moreover an ideal is prime if and only if it is primary and semiprime (also called radical ideal in the commutative case).
- Every primary ideal is primal.
- If ${\mathfrak q}$ is a primary ideal, then the radical of ${\mathfrak q}$ is necessarily a prime ideal ${\mathfrak p}$, and this ideal is called the associated prime ideal of ${\mathfrak q}$. In this situation, ${\mathfrak q}$ is said to be ${\mathfrak p}$-primary.
  - On the other hand, an ideal whose radical is prime is not necessarily primary: for example, if $R = k[x,y,z]/(x y - z^2)$, $\mathfrak{p} = (\overline{x}, \overline{z})$, and $\mathfrak{q} = \mathfrak{p}^2$, then $\mathfrak{p}$ is prime and $\sqrt{\mathfrak{q}} = \mathfrak{p}$, but we have $\overline{x} \overline{y} = {\overline{z}}^2 \in \mathfrak{p}^2 = \mathfrak{q}$, $\overline{x} \not \in \mathfrak{q}$, and ${\overline{y}}^n \not \in \mathfrak{q}$ for all $n>0$, so $\mathfrak{q}$ is not primary. The primary decomposition of $\mathfrak{q}$ is $(\overline{x}) \cap ({\overline{x}}^2, \overline{x} \overline{z}, \overline{y})$; here $(\overline{x})$ is $\mathfrak{p}$-primary and $({\overline{x}}^2, \overline{x} \overline{z}, \overline{y})$ is $(\overline{x}, \overline{y}, \overline{z})$-primary.
    - An ideal whose radical is maximal, however, is primary.
    - Every ideal ${\mathfrak q}$ with radical ${\mathfrak p}$ is contained in a smallest ${\mathfrak p}$-primary ideal: all elements $a$ such that $ax\in {\mathfrak q}$ for some $x\notin {\mathfrak p}$. The smallest ${\mathfrak p}$-primary ideal containing ${\mathfrak p}^n$ is called the $n$th symbolic power of ${\mathfrak p}$.
- If ${\mathfrak p}$ is a maximal prime ideal, then any ideal whose radical is ${\mathfrak p}$ is ${\mathfrak p}$-primary (and vice versa). In particular, a power of ${\mathfrak p}$ or an ideal containing a power of ${\mathfrak p}$ is ${\mathfrak p}$-primary. But a ${\mathfrak p}$-primary ideal need not be a power of ${\mathfrak p}$ and need not contain a power of ${\mathfrak p}$; for example, the ideal $(x,y^2)$ is ${\mathfrak p}$-primary for the ideal ${\mathfrak p}=(x,y)$ in the ring $k[x,y]$, but is not a power of ${\mathfrak p}$; however, it contains ${\mathfrak p}^2$.
- If $A$ is a Noetherian ring and ${\mathfrak p}$ a prime ideal, then the kernel of $A \to A_{\mathfrak p}$, the map from $A$ to the localization of $A$ at ${\mathfrak p}$, is the intersection of all ${\mathfrak p}$-primary ideals.
- If $\mathfrak{p}$ is maximal, a finite nonempty product of $\mathfrak{p}$-primary ideals is $\mathfrak{p}$-primary but an infinite product of $\mathfrak{p}$-primary ideals may not be $\mathfrak p$-primary; since for example, in a Noetherian local ring with maximal ideal $\mathfrak m$, $\textstyle\bigcap_{n > 0} \mathfrak{m}^n = 0$ (Krull intersection theorem) where each $\mathfrak{m}^n$ is $\mathfrak{m}$-primary, for example the infinite product of the maximal (and hence prime and hence primary) ideal $m=\langle x,y \rangle$ of the local ring $K[x,y]/\langle x^2, xy\rangle$ yields the zero ideal, which in this case is not primary (because the zero divisor $y$ is not nilpotent). In fact, in a Noetherian ring, a nonempty product of $\mathfrak{p}$-primary ideals $Q_i$ is $\mathfrak{p}$-primary if and only if there exists some integer $n > 0$ such that $\mathfrak{p}^n \subset \textstyle\bigcap_i Q_i$.

== Decomposition of ideals into primary ideals ==
The primary decomposition of ideals by the Lasker–Noether theorem may be seen as a generalization of the fundamental theorem of arithmetic, which applies to the integers $\mathbb{Z}$ and other unique factorization domains, to general Noetherian rings. While the unique factorization of elements of a ring into the product of irreducible elements (up to units and reordering) fails in the general case, the Lasker–Noether theorem states that the ideals of a Noetherian ring do still have a type of "unique factorization": any ideal in a Noetherian ring can be written as an intersection of primary ideals of the ring in a primary decomposition, and while these component primary ideals are not necessarily unique, the radicals of these components, the associated primes of the ideal, are unique up to reordering:

Theorem (Lasker–Noether)—Let $A$ be a commutative Noetherian ring and let $\mathfrak{a}$ be an ideal of $A$. Then $\mathfrak{a}$ may be written as the intersection of finitely many primary ideals; that is:

$$\mathfrak{a}=\bigcap _{i=1}^{n}\mathfrak{q}_{i}$$

with each $\mathfrak{q}_i$ primary. The expression of $\mathfrak{a}$ in this way is said to be a primary decomposition of $\mathfrak{a}.$ Furthermore, if (1) the $\sqrt{\mathfrak{q}_i}$ are all distinct and (2) $\mathfrak{q}_i\nsupseteq \bigcap_{j\neq i} \mathfrak{q}_j$ for each $i$, then the primary decomposition is said to be irredundant. Any primary decomposition can be reduced to an irredundant one, and, if the aforementioned primary decomposition of $\mathfrak{a}$ is irredundant, and

$$\mathfrak{a}=\bigcap _{i=1}^{n'}\mathfrak{q}'_{i}$$

is another irredundant primary decomposition of $\mathfrak{a}$, then $n=n'$ and $\{\sqrt{\mathfrak{q}_i}\} = \{\sqrt{\mathfrak{q}'_i}\}$.
