= Annihilator (ring theory) =

Ideal that maps to zero a subset of a module

In mathematics, the annihilator of a subset S of a module over a ring is the ideal formed by the elements of the ring that always give zero when multiplied by each element of S. For example, if $R$ is a commutative ring and $I$ is an ideal of $R$, we can consider the quotient ring $R/I$ to be an $R$-module. Then, the annihilator of $R/I$ is the ideal $I$, since all of the $i \in I$ act via the zero map on $R/I$.

Over an integral domain, a module that has a nonzero annihilator is a torsion module, and a finitely generated torsion module has a nonzero annihilator.

The above definition applies also in the case of noncommutative rings, a subset of a left module has a left annihilator, which is a left ideal, and a subset of a right module has a right annihilator, which is a right ideal. If $S$ is a module, then the annihilator is always a two-sided ideal, regardless of whether the module is a left module or a right module.

== Definitions ==
Let R be a ring, and let M be a left R-module. Choose a non-empty subset S of M. The annihilator of S, denoted Ann_{R}(S), is the set of all elements r in R such that, for all s in S, rs = 0. In set notation,

$\mathrm{Ann}_R(S)=\{r\in R\mid rs = 0$ for all $s\in S \}$

It is the set of all elements of R that "annihilate" S (the elements for which S is a torsion set). Subsets of right modules may be used as well, after the modification of "sr = 0" in the definition.

The annihilator of a single element x is usually written Ann_{R}(x) instead of Ann_{R}({x}). If the ring R can be understood from the context, the subscript R can be omitted.

Since R is a module over itself, S may be taken to be a subset of R itself, and since R is both a right and a left R-module, the notation must be modified slightly to indicate the left or right side. Usually $\ell.\!\mathrm{Ann}_R(S)\,$ and $r.\!\mathrm{Ann}_R(S)\,$ or some similar subscript scheme are used to distinguish the left and right annihilators, if necessary.

If M is an R-module and Ann_{R}(M) = 0, then M is called a faithful module.

== Properties ==
If S is a subset of a left R-module M, then Ann(S) is a left ideal of R. If S is not just a subset but also a submodule of M, then Ann_{R}(S) is moreover a two-sided ideal: (ac)s = a(cs) = 0, since cs is another element of S.

If S is a subset of M and N is the submodule of M generated by S, then in general Ann_{R}(N) is a subset of Ann_{R}(S), but they are not necessarily equal. If R is commutative, then the equality holds.

An R-module M may be also viewed as an R/Ann_{R}(M)-module using the action $\overline{r}m:=rm\,$. It is not always possible to make an R-module into an R/I-module this way, but if the ideal I is a subset of the annihilator of M, then this action is well-defined. The module M is always faithful when considered as an R/Ann_{R}(M)-module.

=== For commutative rings ===
Throughout this section, let $R$ be a commutative ring and $M$ an $R$-module.

==== Relation to support ====
The support of a module is defined as

$$\operatorname{Supp}M = \{ \mathfrak{p} \in \operatorname{Spec}R \mid M_\mathfrak{p} \neq 0 \}.$$

When the module is finitely generated, the support of $M$ is exactly the set of prime ideals containing $\operatorname{Ann}_R(M)$.

==== Short exact sequences ====
Given a short exact sequence of modules,

$$0 \to M' \to M \to M'' \to 0,$$

we have the relations

$$\operatorname{Ann}_R(M') \cap \operatorname{Ann}_R(M'') \supseteq \operatorname{Ann}_R(M) \supseteq \operatorname{Ann}_R(M') \operatorname{Ann}_R(M'').$$

If the sequence splits, so that $M \cong M' \oplus M''$, then the inequality on the left is always an equality. Indeed, this holds for arbitrary direct sums of modules:

$$\operatorname{Ann}_R\left( \bigoplus_{i\in I} M_i \right) = \bigcap_{i\in I} \operatorname{Ann}_R(M_i).$$

In the special case that $M' = IM$ and $M'' = M/IM$ for some ideal $I \subset R$, we have the relation $\operatorname{Ann}_R(M/IM) \supseteq \operatorname{Ann}_R(M) + I$.

== Examples ==
=== Over the integers ===
Over $\mathbb{Z}$, any finitely generated module is completely classified, by the fundamental theorem of abelian groups, as a direct sum between its free part and its torsion part. Therefore, if the annihilator of a finitely generated module is non-trivial, it must be exactly equal to the torsion part of the module. This is because

$$\text{Ann}_{\mathbb{Z}}(\mathbb{Z}^{\oplus k}) = \{ 0 \} = (0)$$

since the only element annihilating each of the $\mathbb{Z}$ is $0$. For example, the annihilator of $\mathbb{Z}/2 \oplus \mathbb{Z}/3$ is

$$\text{Ann}_\mathbb{Z}(\mathbb{Z}/2 \oplus \mathbb{Z}/3) = (6) = (\text{lcm}(2,3)),$$

the ideal generated by $(6)$. In fact the annihilator of a torsion module

$$M \cong \bigoplus_{i=1}^n (\mathbb{Z}/a_i)^{\oplus k_i}$$

is isomorphic to the ideal generated by their least common multiple, $(\operatorname{lcm}(a_1, \ldots, a_n))$. This shows the annihilators can be easily classified over the integers.

=== Over a commutative ring R ===
There is a similar computation that can be done for any finitely presented module over a commutative ring $R$. The definition of finite presentedness of $M$ implies there exists an exact sequence, called a presentation, given by

$$R^{\oplus l} \xrightarrow{\phi} R^{\oplus k} \to M \to 0$$

where $\phi$ is in $\text{Mat}_{k,l}(R)$. Writing $\phi$ explicitly as a matrix gives it as

$$\phi = \begin{bmatrix}
\phi_{1,1} & \cdots & \phi_{1,l} \\
\vdots &  & \vdots \\
\phi_{k,1} & \cdots & \phi_{k,l}
\end{bmatrix};$$

hence $M$ has the direct sum decomposition

$$M = \bigoplus_{i=1}^k \frac{R}{(\phi_{i,1}(1), \ldots, \phi_{i,l}(1))}$$

If each of these ideals is written as

$$I_i = (\phi_{i,1}(1), \ldots, \phi_{i,l}(1))$$

then the ideal $I$ given by

$$V(I) = \bigcup^{k}_{i=1}V(I_i)$$

presents the annihilator.

=== Over k[x,y] ===
Over the commutative ring $k[x,y]$ for a field $k$, the annihilator of the module

$$M = \frac{k[x,y]}{(x^2 - y)} \oplus \frac{k[x,y]}{(y - 3)}$$

is given by the ideal

$$\text{Ann}_{k[x,y]}(M) = ((x^2 - y)(y - 3)).$$

== Chain conditions on annihilator ideals ==
The lattice of ideals of the form $\ell.\!\mathrm{Ann}_R(S)$ where S is a subset of R is a complete lattice when partially ordered by inclusion. There is interest in studying rings for which this lattice (or its right counterpart) satisfies the ascending chain condition or descending chain condition.

Denote the lattice of left annihilator ideals of R as $\mathcal{LA}\,$ and the lattice of right annihilator ideals of R as $\mathcal{RA}\,$. It is known that $\mathcal{LA}\,$ satisfies the ascending chain condition if and only if $\mathcal{RA}\,$ satisfies the descending chain condition, and symmetrically $\mathcal{RA}\,$ satisfies the ascending chain condition if and only if $\mathcal{LA}\,$ satisfies the descending chain condition. If either lattice has either of these chain conditions, then R has no infinite pairwise orthogonal sets of idempotents.

If R is a ring for which $\mathcal{LA}\,$ satisfies the A.C.C. and _{R}R has finite uniform dimension, then R is called a left Goldie ring.

== Category-theoretic description for commutative rings ==
When $R$ is commutative and $M$ is an $R$-module, we may describe $\mathrm{Ann}_R(M)$ as the kernel of the action map $R\to\mathrm{End}_R(M)$ determined by the adjunct map of the identity $M\to M$ along the Hom-tensor adjunction.

More generally, given a bilinear map of modules $F\colon M \times N \to P$, the annihilator of a subset $S \subseteq M$ is the set of all elements in $N$ that annihilate $S$:

$$\operatorname{Ann}(S) := \{ n \in N \mid \forall s \in S: F(s,n) = 0 \} .$$

Conversely, given $T \subseteq N$, one can define an annihilator as a subset of $M$.

The annihilator gives a Galois connection between subsets of $M$ and $N$, and the associated closure operator is stronger than the span. In particular:

- annihilators are submodules
- $\operatorname{Span}S \leq \operatorname{Ann}(\operatorname{Ann}(S))$
- $\operatorname{Ann}(\operatorname{Ann}(\operatorname{Ann}(S))) = \operatorname{Ann}(S)$

An important special case is in the presence of a nondegenerate form on a vector space, particularly an inner product: then the annihilator associated to the map $V \times V \to K$ is called the orthogonal complement.

== Relations to other properties of rings ==
Given a module M over a Noetherian commutative ring R, a prime ideal of R that is an annihilator of a nonzero element of M is called an associated prime of M.

- Annihilators are used to define left Rickart rings and Baer rings.
- The set of (left) zero divisors D_{S} of S can be written as

$$D_S = \bigcup_{x \in S \setminus \{0\}}{\mathrm{Ann}_R(x)}.$$

(Here we allow zero to be a zero divisor.)
In particular D_{R} is the set of (left) zero divisors of R taking S = R and R acting on itself as a left R-module.

- When R is commutative and Noetherian, the set $D_R$ is precisely equal to the union of the associated primes of the R-module R.

== See also ==
- Faltings' annihilator theorem
- Socle
- Support of a module
