= Catenary ring =

In mathematics, a commutative ring R is catenary if for any pair of prime ideals p, q, any two strictly increasing chains

p = p_{0} ⊂ p_{1} ⊂ ... ⊂ p_{n} = q

of prime ideals are contained in maximal strictly increasing chains from p to q of the same (finite) length. In a geometric situation, in which the dimension of an algebraic variety attached to a prime ideal will decrease as the prime ideal becomes bigger, the length of such a chain n is usually the difference in dimensions.

A ring is called universally catenary if all finitely generated algebras over it are catenary rings.

The word 'catenary' is derived from the Latin word catena, which means "chain".

There is the following chain of inclusions.

Universally catenary rings ⊃ Cohen–Macaulay rings ⊃ Gorenstein rings ⊃ complete intersection rings ⊃ regular local rings

== Dimension formula ==
Suppose that A is a Noetherian domain and B is a domain containing A that is finitely generated over A. If P is a prime ideal of B and p its intersection with A, then

$$\text{height}(P)\le \text{height}(p)+ \text{tr.deg.}_A(B) - \text{tr.deg.}_{\kappa(p)}(\kappa(P)).$$

The dimension formula for universally catenary rings says that equality holds if A is universally catenary. Here κ(P) is the residue field of P and tr.deg. means the transcendence degree (of quotient fields). In fact, when A is not universally catenary, but $B=A[x_1,\dots,x_n]$, then equality also holds.

== Examples ==
Almost all Noetherian rings that appear in algebraic geometry are universally catenary. In particular the following rings are universally catenary:

- Complete Noetherian local rings
- Dedekind domains (and fields)
- Cohen–Macaulay rings (and regular local rings)
- Any localization of a universally catenary ring
- Any finitely generated algebra over a universally catenary ring.

=== A ring that is catenary but not universally catenary ===
It is delicate to construct examples of Noetherian rings that are not universally catenary. The first example was found by Masayoshi Nagata (1956, 1962, page 203 example 2), who found a 2-dimensional Noetherian local domain that is catenary but not universally catenary.

Nagata's example is as follows. Choose a field k and a formal power series z=Σ_{i>0}a_{i}x^{i} in the ring S of formal power series in x over k such that z and x are algebraically independent.

Define z_{1} = z and z_{i+1}=z_{i}/x–a_{i}.

Let R be the (non-Noetherian) ring generated by x and all the elements z_{i}.

Let m be the ideal (x), and let n be the ideal generated by x–1 and all the elements z_{i}. These are both maximal ideals of R, with residue fields isomorphic to k. The local ring R_{m} is a regular local ring of dimension 1 (the proof of this uses the fact that z and x are algebraically independent) and the local ring R_{n} is a regular Noetherian local ring of dimension 2.

Let B be the localization of R with respect to all elements not in either m or n. Then B is a 2-dimensional Noetherian semi-local ring with 2 maximal ideals, mB (of height 1) and nB (of height 2).

Let I be the Jacobson radical of B, and let A = k+I. The ring A is a local domain of dimension 2 with maximal ideal I, so is catenary because all 2-dimensional local domains are catenary. The ring A is Noetherian because B is Noetherian and is a finite A-module. However A is not universally catenary, because if it were then the ideal mB of B would have the same height as mB∩A by the dimension formula for universally catenary rings, but the latter ideal has height equal to dim(A)=2.

Nagata's example is also a quasi-excellent ring, so gives an example of a quasi-excellent ring that is not an excellent ring.

== See also ==
- Formally catenary ring (which is the same as a universally catenary ring).

== See also ==
- Ring theory
- Local rings
- Commutative rings
- Cohen–Macaulay rings
- Gorenstein local rings
