= Associated prime =

Prime ideal that is an annihilator of a prime submodule

In abstract algebra, an associated prime of a module M over a ring R is a type of prime ideal of R that arises as an annihilator of a (prime) submodule of M. The set of associated primes is usually denoted by $\operatorname{Ass}_R(M),$ and sometimes called the assassin or assassinator of M (word play between the notation and the fact that an associated prime is an annihilator).

In commutative algebra, associated primes are linked to the Lasker–Noether primary decomposition of ideals in commutative Noetherian rings. Specifically, if an ideal J is decomposed as a finite intersection of primary ideals, the radicals of these primary ideals are prime ideals, and this set of prime ideals coincides with $\operatorname{Ass}_R(R/J).$ Also linked with the concept of "associated primes" of the ideal are the notions of isolated primes and embedded primes.

== Definitions ==
A nonzero R-module N is called a prime module if the annihilator $\mathrm{Ann}_R(N)=\mathrm{Ann}_R(N')\,$ for any nonzero submodule N' of N. For a prime module N, $\mathrm{Ann}_R(N)\,$ is a prime ideal in R.

An associated prime of an R-module M is an ideal of the form $\mathrm{Ann}_R(N)\,$ where N is a prime submodule of M. In commutative algebra the usual definition is different, but equivalent: if R is commutative, an associated prime P of M is a prime ideal of the form $\mathrm{Ann}_R(m)\,$ for a nonzero element m of M or equivalently $R/P$ is isomorphic to a submodule of M.

In a commutative ring R, minimal elements in $\operatorname{Ass}_R(M)$ (with respect to the set-theoretic inclusion) are called isolated primes while the rest of the associated primes (i.e., those properly containing associated primes) are called embedded primes.

A module is called coprimary if xm = 0 for some nonzero m ∈ M implies x^{n}M = 0 for some positive integer n. A nonzero finitely generated module M over a commutative Noetherian ring is coprimary if and only if it has exactly one associated prime. A submodule N of M is called P-primary if $M/N$ is coprimary with P. An ideal I is a P-primary ideal if and only if $\operatorname{Ass}_R(R/I) = \{P\}$; thus, the notion is a generalization of a primary ideal.

== Properties ==
Most of these properties and assertions are given in (Lam 1999) starting on page 86.

- If M' ⊆M, then $\mathrm{Ass}_R(M')\subseteq\mathrm{Ass}_R(M).$ If in addition M' is an essential submodule of M, their associated primes coincide.
- It is possible, even for a commutative local ring, that the set of associated primes of a finitely generated module is empty. However, in any ring satisfying the ascending chain condition on ideals (for example, any right or left Noetherian ring) every nonzero module has at least one associated prime.
- Any uniform module has either zero or one associated primes, making uniform modules an example of coprimary modules.
- For a one-sided Noetherian ring, there is a surjection from the set of isomorphism classes of indecomposable injective modules onto the spectrum $\mathrm{Spec}(R).$ If R is an Artinian ring, then this map becomes a bijection.
- Matlis' Theorem: For a commutative Noetherian ring R, the map from the isomorphism classes of indecomposable injective modules to the spectrum is a bijection. Moreover, a complete set of representatives for those classes is given by $E(R/\mathfrak{p})\,$ where $E(-)\,$ denotes the injective hull and $\mathfrak{p}\,$ ranges over the prime ideals of R.
- For a Noetherian module M over any ring, there are only finitely many associated primes of M.

For the case for commutative Noetherian rings, see also Primary decomposition#Primary decomposition from associated primes.

== Examples ==
- If $R = \mathbb{C}[x,y,z,w]$ the associated prime ideals of $I = ((x^2 + y^2 + z^2 + w^2)\cdot (z^3 - w^3 -3x^3))$ are the ideals $(x^2 + y^2 + z^2 + w^2)$ and $(z^3 - w^3 -3x^3).$
- If R is the ring of integers, then non-trivial free abelian groups and non-trivial abelian groups of prime power order are coprimary.
- If R is the ring of integers and M a finite abelian group, then the associated primes of M are exactly the primes dividing the order of M.
- The group of order 2 is a quotient of the integers Z (considered as a free module over itself), but its associated prime ideal (2) is not an associated prime of Z.
