= Fractional ideal =

Submodule of fractions in abstract algebra

In mathematics, in particular commutative algebra, the concept of fractional ideal is introduced in the context of integral domains and is particularly fruitful in the study of Dedekind domains. In some sense, fractional ideals of an integral domain are like ideals where denominators are allowed. In contexts where fractional ideals and ordinary ring ideals are both under discussion, the latter are sometimes termed integral ideals for clarity.

== Definition and basic results ==
Let $R$ be an integral domain, and let $K = \operatorname{Frac}R$ be its field of fractions.

A fractional ideal of $R$ is an $R$-submodule $I$ of $K$ such that there exists a non-zero $r \in R$ such that $rI\subseteq R$. Equivalently, $I \subseteq K$ is a fractional ideal of $R$ if $I = r^{-1}J$, where $r$ is a non-zero element of $R$ and $J$ is an ideal of $R$. The element $r$ can be thought of as clearing out the denominators in $I$, hence the name fractional ideal.

The principal fractional ideals are those $R$-submodules of $K$ generated by a single nonzero element of $K$. A fractional ideal $I$ is contained in $R$ if and only if it is an (integral) ideal of $R$.

A fractional ideal $I$ is called invertible if there is another fractional ideal $J$ such that

$$IJ = R$$

where

$$IJ = \{ a_1 b_1 + a_2 b_2 + \cdots + a_n b_n : a_i \in I, b_j \in J, n \in \mathbb{Z}_{>0} \}$$

is the product of the two fractional ideals.

In this case, the fractional ideal $J$ is uniquely determined and equal to the generalized ideal quotient

$$(R :_{K} I) = \{ x \in K : xI \subseteq R \}.$$

The set of invertible fractional ideals forms a commutative group with respect to the above product, where the identity is the unit ideal $(1) = R$ itself. This group is called the group of fractional ideals of $R$. The principal fractional ideals form a subgroup. A (nonzero) fractional ideal is invertible if and only if it is projective as an $R$-module. Geometrically, this means an invertible fractional ideal can be interpreted as a rank 1 vector bundle over the affine scheme $\text{Spec}(R)$.

Every finitely generated R-submodule of K is a fractional ideal and if $R$ is noetherian, then these are all the fractional ideals of $R$.

== Dedekind domains ==
In Dedekind domains, the situation is much simpler. In particular, every non-zero fractional ideal is invertible. In fact, this property characterizes Dedekind domains:

An integral domain is a Dedekind domain if and only if every non-zero fractional ideal is invertible.

The set of fractional ideals over a Dedekind domain $R$ is denoted $\text{Div}(R)$.

Its quotient group of fractional ideals by the subgroup of principal fractional ideals is an important invariant of a Dedekind domain called the ideal class group.

== Number fields ==
For the special case of a number field $K$ (such as a cyclotomic field) there is an associated ring denoted $\mathcal{O}_K$ called the ring of integers of $K$. For example, $\mathcal{O}_{\mathbb{Q}(\sqrt{d}\,)} = \mathbb{Z}[\sqrt{d}\,]$ for $d$ square-free and congruent to $2,3 \text{ }(\text{mod } 4)$. The key property of these rings $\mathcal{O}_K$ is they are Dedekind domains. Hence the theory of fractional ideals can be described for the rings of integers of number fields. In fact, class field theory is the study of such groups of class rings.

=== Associated structures ===
For the ring of integers^{pg 2} $\mathcal{O}_K$ of a number field, the group of fractional ideals forms a group denoted $\mathcal{I}_K$ and the subgroup of principal fractional ideals is denoted $\mathcal{P}_K$. The ideal class group is the group of fractional ideals modulo the principal fractional ideals, so

$$\mathcal{C}_K := \mathcal{I}_K/\mathcal{P}_K$$

and its class number $h_K$ is the order of the group, $h_K = |\mathcal{C}_K|$. In some ways, the class number is a measure for how "far" the ring of integers $\mathcal{O}_K$ is from being a unique factorization domain (UFD). This is because $h_K = 1$ if and only if $\mathcal{O}_K$ is a UFD.

==== Exact sequence for ideal class groups ====
There is an exact sequence

$$0 \to \mathcal{O}_K^* \to K^* \to \mathcal{I}_K \to \mathcal{C}_K \to 0$$

associated to every number field.

=== Structure theorem for fractional ideals ===
One of the important structure theorems for fractional ideals of a number field states that every fractional ideal $I$ decomposes uniquely up to ordering as

$$I = (\mathfrak{p}_1\ldots\mathfrak{p}_n)(\mathfrak{q}_1\ldots\mathfrak{q}_m)^{-1}$$

for prime ideals

$$\mathfrak{p}_i,\mathfrak{q}_j \in \text{Spec}(\mathcal{O}_K)$$.

in the spectrum of $\mathcal{O}_K$. For example,

$\frac{2}{5}\mathcal{O}_{\mathbb{Q}(i)}$ factors as $(1+i)(1-i)((1+2i)(1-2i))^{-1}$

Another useful structure theorem is that integral fractional ideals are generated by up to 2 elements. We call a fractional ideal which is a subset of $\mathcal{O}_K$ integral.

== Examples ==
- $\frac{5}{4}\mathbb{Z}$ is a fractional ideal over $\mathbb{Z}$
- For $K = \mathbb{Q}(i)$ the ideal $(5)$ splits in $\mathcal{O}_{\mathbb{Q}(i)} = \mathbb{Z}[i]$ as $(2-i)(2+i)$
- For $K=\mathbb{Q}_{\zeta_3}$ we have the factorization $(3) = (2\zeta_3 + 1)^2$. This is because if we multiply it out, we get
  $$\begin{align}
(2\zeta_3 + 1)^2 &= 4\zeta_3^2 + 4\zeta_3 + 1 \\
&= 4(\zeta_3^2 + \zeta_3) + 1
\end{align}$$

Since $\zeta_3$ satisfies $\zeta_3^2 + \zeta_3 =-1$, our factorization makes sense.

- For $K=\mathbb{Q}(\sqrt{-23})$ we can multiply the fractional ideals

$I = \left(2, \frac12\sqrt{-23} - \frac12\right)$ and $J=\left(4,\frac12\sqrt{-23} + \frac32\right)$

to get the ideal

$$IJ=\left(\frac12\sqrt{-23}+\frac32\right).$$

== Divisorial ideal ==
Let $\tilde I$ denote the intersection of all principal fractional ideals containing a nonzero fractional ideal $I$.

Equivalently,

$$\tilde I = (R : (R : I)),$$

where as above

$$(R : I) = \{ x \in K : xI \subseteq R \}.$$

If $\tilde I = I$ then I is called divisorial. In other words, a divisorial ideal is a nonzero intersection of some nonempty set of fractional principal ideals.

If I is divisorial and J is a nonzero fractional ideal, then (I : J) is divisorial.

Let R be a local Krull domain (e.g., a Noetherian integrally closed local domain). Then R is a discrete valuation ring if and only if the maximal ideal of R is divisorial.

An integral domain that satisfies the ascending chain conditions on divisorial ideals is called a Mori domain.

== See also ==
- Divisorial sheaf
- Dedekind–Kummer theorem
