= Ideal quotient =

Type of set in abstract algebra

In abstract algebra, if $I$ and $J$ are ideals of a commutative ring $R$, their ideal quotient $(I:J)$ is the set

$$(I : J) = \{r \in R \mid rJ \subseteq I\}$$

Then $(I:J)$ is itself an ideal in $R$. The ideal quotient is viewed as a quotient because $KJ \subseteq I$ if and only if $K \subseteq (I : J)$. The ideal quotient is useful for calculating primary decompositions. It also arises in the description of the set difference in algebraic geometry (see below).

$(I:J)$ is sometimes referred to as a colon ideal because of the notation. In the context of fractional ideals, there is a related notion of the inverse of a fractional ideal.

== Properties ==
The ideal quotient satisfies the following properties:

- $(I :J)=\mathrm{Ann}_R((J+I)/I)$ as $R$-modules, where $\mathrm{Ann}_R(M)$ denotes the annihilator of $M$ as an $R$-module.
- $J \subseteq I \Leftrightarrow (I : J) = R$ (in particular, $(I : I) = (R : I) = (I : 0) = R$)
- $(I : R) = I$
- $(I : (JK)) = ((I : J) : K)$
- $(I : (J + K)) = (I : J) \cap (I : K)$
- $((I \cap J) : K) = (I : K) \cap (J : K)$
- $(I : (r)) = \frac{1}{r}(I \cap (r))$ (as long as $R$ is an integral domain)

== Calculating the quotient ==
The above properties can be used to calculate the quotient of ideals in a polynomial ring given their generators. For example, if $I=(f_1,f_2,f_3)$ and $J=(g_1,g_2)$ are ideals in $\mathbb k[x_1,\ldots,x_n]$, then

$$(I : J) = (I : (g_1)) \cap (I : (g_2)) = \left(\frac{1}{g_1}(I \cap (g_1))\right) \cap \left(\frac{1}{g_2}(I \cap (g_2))\right)$$

Then elimination theory can be used to calculate the intersection of $I$ with $(g_1)$ and $(g_2)$:

$$I \cap (g_1) = tI + (1-t) (g_1) \cap \mathbb k[x_1, \dots, x_n], \quad I \cap (g_2) = tI + (1-t) (g_2) \cap \mathbb k[x_1, \dots, x_n]$$

Calculate a Gröbner basis for $tI+(1-t)(g_1)$ with respect to lexicographic order. Then the basis functions which have no t in them generate $I \cap (g_1)$.

== Geometric interpretation ==
The ideal quotient corresponds to set difference in algebraic geometry. More precisely,

- If $W$ is an affine variety (not necessarily irreducible) and $S$ is a subset of the affine space (not necessarily a variety), then

$$I(S) : I(W) = I(S \setminus W)$$

where $I(\bullet)$ denotes the taking of the ideal associated to a subset.

- If $I$ and $J$ are ideals in $\mathbb k[x_1,\ldots,x_n]$, with $\mathbb k$ an algebraically closed field and $I$ radical then

$$V(I : J) = \mathrm{cl}(V(I) \setminus V(J))$$

where $\mathrm{cl}(\bullet)$ denotes the Zariski closure, and $V(\bullet)$ denotes the taking of the variety defined by an ideal. If $I$ is not radical, then the same property holds if we saturate the ideal $J$:

$$V(I : J^{\infty}) = \mathrm{cl}(V(I) \setminus V(J))$$

where $(I : J^\infty )= \cup_{n \geq 1} (I:J^n)$.

== Examples ==
- In $\mathbb{Z}$ we have $((6):(2)) = (3)$.
- In algebraic number theory, the ideal quotient is useful while studying fractional ideals. This is because the inverse of any invertible fractional ideal $I$ of an integral domain $R$ is given by the ideal quotient $((1):I) = I^{-1}$.
- One geometric application of the ideal quotient is removing an irreducible component of an affine scheme. For example, let $I = (xyz), J = (xy)$ in $\mathbb{C}[x,y,z]$ be the ideals corresponding to the union of the x,y, and z-planes and x and y planes in $\mathbb{A}^3_\mathbb{C}$. Then, the ideal quotient $(I:J) = (z)$ is the ideal of the z-plane in $\mathbb{A}^3_\mathbb{C}$. This shows how the ideal quotient can be used to "delete" irreducible subschemes.
- A useful scheme theoretic example is taking the ideal quotient of a reducible ideal. For example, the ideal quotient $((x^4y^3):(x^2y^2)) = (x^2y)$, showing that the ideal quotient of a subscheme of some non-reduced scheme, where both have the same reduced subscheme, kills off some of the non-reduced structure.
- We can use the previous example to find the saturation of an ideal corresponding to a projective scheme. Given a homogeneous ideal $I \subset R[x_0,\ldots,x_n]$ the saturation of $I$ is defined as the ideal quotient $(I: \mathfrak{m}^\infty) = \cup_{i \geq 1} (I:\mathfrak{m}^i)$ where $\mathfrak{m} = (x_0,\ldots,x_n) \subset R[x_0,\ldots, x_n]$. It is a theorem that the set of saturated ideals of $R[x_0,\ldots, x_n]$ contained in $\mathfrak{m}$ is in bijection with the set of projective subschemes in $\mathbb{P}^n_R$. This shows us that $(x^4 + y^4 + z^4)\mathfrak{m}^k$ defines the same projective curve as $(x^4 + y^4 + z^4)$ in $\mathbb{P}^2_\mathbb{C}$.
