= Irvin Cohen =

American mathematician (1917–1955)

Irvin S. Cohen
- Born: 1917
- Died: February 14, 1955 (aged 37–38)
- Education: Johns Hopkins University (Ph.D., 1942)
- Known for: Cohen-Macaulay rings, Cohen structure theorem, Cohen-Seidenberg theorems, unmixedness theorem, Cohen rings
- Scientific career
- Fields: Mathematics
- Workplaces: Massachusetts Institute of Technology
- Doctoral advisor: Oscar Zariski
- Doctoral students: R. Duncan Luce

Irvin Sol Cohen (1917 – February 14, 1955) was an American mathematician at the Massachusetts Institute of Technology who worked on local rings. He was a student of Oscar Zariski at Johns Hopkins University.

In his thesis he proved the Cohen structure theorem for complete Noetherian local rings. In 1946 he proved the unmixedness theorem for power series rings. As a result, Cohen–Macaulay rings are named after him and Francis Sowerby Macaulay. In 1950, he proved that a commutative ring whose prime ideals are all finitely generated is a Noetherian ring.

Cohen and Abraham Seidenberg published their Cohen–Seidenberg theorems, also known as the going-up and going-down theorems. He also coauthored articles with Irving Kaplansky. One of his doctoral students was R. Duncan Luce.

== Death ==
Cohen died unexpectedly in 1955 one week after having visited Zariski in Cambridge, apparently from suicide. Many years later Zariski said of his death:

Many things are necessary to make a good scientist, a creative man, and left on his own Cohen found himself unproductive. Highly critical of himself and others, he believed that nothing he ever wrote was as good as his thesis. He became increasingly involved with abstract algebra until he found himself at a certain point without ground under his feet. He became disappointed in his work, and finally, fatally, in his own ability.

== Publications ==
- Cohen, I. S. (1946). "On the structure and ideal theory of complete local rings". Transactions of the American Mathematical Society. 59 (1): 54–106. doi:10.2307/1990313. JSTOR 1990313.
- Cohen, I.S.; Seidenberg, A. (1946). "Prime ideals and integral dependence". Bulletin of the American Mathematical Society. 52 (4): 252–261. doi:10.1090/s0002-9904-1946-08552-3. MR 0015379.
- Cohen, I.S.; Kaplansky, Irving (1946). "Rings With a Finite Number of Primes. I". Transactions of the American Mathematical Society. 60 (3): 468–477. doi:10.2307/1990350. JSTOR 1990350.
- Cohen, I.S. (1950). "Commutative rings with restricted minimum condition". Duke Mathematical Journal. 71 (1).
- Cohen, I.S. (1954). "Length of prime ideal chains". American Journal of Mathematics. 76 (3): 654–668. doi:10.2307/2372708. JSTOR 2372708.
- Cohen, I.S.; Kaplansky, Irving (1951). "Rings for which every module is a direct sum of cyclic modules". Mathematische Zeitschrift. 54 (1): 97–101. doi:10.1007/BF01179851. S2CID 123538023.
- Cohen, I.S.; Zariski, Oscar (1957). "A fundamental inequality in the theory of extensions of valuations". Illinois Journal of Mathematics. 1 (1): 1–8. doi:10.1215/ijm/1255378500.
