= Generalized Cohen–Macaulay ring =

Local ring in mathematics

In algebra, a generalized Cohen–Macaulay ring is a commutative Noetherian local ring $(A, \mathfrak{m})$ of Krull dimension d > 0 that satisfies any of the following equivalent conditions:

- For each integer $i = 0, \dots, d - 1$, the length of the i-th local cohomology of A is finite:
  $$\operatorname{length}_A(\operatorname{H}^i_{\mathfrak{m}}(A)) < \infty$$.
- $\sup_Q (\operatorname{length}_A(A/Q) - e(Q)) < \infty$ where the sup is over all parameter ideals $Q$ and $e(Q)$ is the multiplicity of $Q$.
- There is an $\mathfrak{m}$-primary ideal $Q$ such that for each system of parameters $x_1, \dots, x_d$ in $Q$, $(x_1, \dots, x_{d-1}) : x_d = (x_1, \dots, x_{d-1}) : Q.$
- For each prime ideal $\mathfrak{p}$ of $\widehat{A}$ that is not $\mathfrak{m} \widehat{A}$, $\dim \widehat{A}_{\mathfrak{p}} + \dim \widehat{A}/\mathfrak{p} = d$ and $\widehat{A}_{\mathfrak{p}}$ is Cohen–Macaulay.

The last condition implies that the localization $A_\mathfrak{p}$ is Cohen–Macaulay for each prime ideal $\mathfrak{p} \ne \mathfrak{m}$.

A standard example is the local ring at the vertex of an affine cone over a smooth projective variety. Historically, the notion grew up out of the study of a Buchsbaum ring, a Noetherian local ring A in which $\operatorname{length}_A(A/Q) - e(Q)$ is constant for $\mathfrak{m}$-primary ideals $Q$; see the introduction of.
