= Buchsbaum ring =

In mathematics, Buchsbaum rings are Noetherian local rings such that every system of parameters is a weak sequence. A sequence $(a_1,\cdots,a_r)$ of the maximal ideal $m$ is called a weak sequence if $m\cdot((a_1,\cdots,a_{i-1})\colon a_i)\subset(a_1,\cdots,a_{i-1})$ for all $i$.

They were introduced by Jürgen Stückrad and Wolfgang Vogel (1973) and are named after David Buchsbaum.

Every Cohen–Macaulay local ring is a Buchsbaum ring. Every Buchsbaum ring is a generalized Cohen–Macaulay ring.
