= Cohen–Macaulay ring =

Type of commutative ring in mathematics

In mathematics, a Cohen–Macaulay ring is a commutative ring with some of the algebro-geometric properties of a smooth variety, such as local equidimensionality. Under mild assumptions, a local ring is Cohen–Macaulay exactly when it is a finitely generated free module over a regular local subring. Cohen–Macaulay rings play a central role in commutative algebra: they form a very broad class, and yet they are well understood in many ways.

They are named for Francis Sowerby Macaulay (1916), who proved the unmixedness theorem for polynomial rings, and for Irvin Cohen (1946), who proved the unmixedness theorem for formal power series rings. All Cohen–Macaulay rings have the unmixedness property.

For Noetherian local rings, there is the following chain of inclusions.

Universally catenary rings ⊃ Cohen–Macaulay rings ⊃ Gorenstein rings ⊃ complete intersection rings ⊃ regular local rings

== Definition ==
For a commutative Noetherian local ring R, a finite (i.e. finitely generated) R-module $M\neq 0$ is a Cohen–Macaulay module if $\mathrm{depth}(M) = \mathrm{dim}(M)$ (in general we have: $\mathrm{depth}(M) \leq \mathrm{dim}(M)$, see Auslander–Buchsbaum formula for the relation between depth and dim of a certain kind of modules). On the other hand, $R$ is a module on itself, so we call $R$ a Cohen–Macaulay ring if it is a Cohen–Macaulay module as an $R$-module. A maximal Cohen–Macaulay module is a Cohen–Macaulay module M such that $\mathrm{dim}(M)=\mathrm{dim}(R)$.

The above definition was for a Noetherian local ring. But we can expand the definition for a more general Noetherian ring: If $R$ is a commutative Noetherian ring, then an R-module M is called Cohen–Macaulay module if $M_\mathrm{m}$ is a Cohen–Macaulay module for all maximal ideals $\mathrm{m}\in \mathrm{Supp}(M)$. (This is a kind of circular definition unless we define zero modules as Cohen–Macaulay. So we define zero modules as Cohen–Macaulay modules in this definition.) Now, to define maximal Cohen–Macaulay modules for these rings, we require that $M_\mathrm{m}$ to be such an $R_\mathrm{m}$-module for each maximal ideal $\mathrm{m}$ of R. As in the local case, R is a Cohen–Macaulay ring if it is a Cohen–Macaulay module (as an $R$-module on itself).

== Examples ==
Noetherian rings of the following types are Cohen–Macaulay.

- Any regular local ring. This leads to various examples of Cohen–Macaulay rings, such as the integers $\Z$, or a polynomial ring $K[x_1,\ldots ,x_n]$ over a field K, or a power series ring $K[[x_1,\ldots ,x_n]]$ . In geometric terms, every regular scheme, for example a smooth variety over a field, is Cohen–Macaulay.
- Any 0-dimensional ring (or equivalently, any Artinian ring).
- Any 1-dimensional reduced ring, for example any 1-dimensional domain.
- Any 2-dimensional normal ring.
- Any Gorenstein ring. In particular, any complete intersection ring.
- The ring of invariants $R^G$ when R is a Cohen–Macaulay algebra over a field of characteristic zero and G is a finite group (or more generally, a linear algebraic group whose identity component is reductive). This is the Hochster–Roberts theorem.
- Any determinantal ring. That is, let R be the quotient of a regular local ring S by the ideal I generated by the r × r minors of some p × q matrix of elements of S. If the codimension (or height) of I is equal to the "expected" codimension (p−r+1)(q−r+1), R is called a determinantal ring. In that case, R is Cohen−Macaulay. Similarly, coordinate rings of determinantal varieties are Cohen–Macaulay.

Some more examples:

1. The ring K[x]/(x²) has dimension 0 and hence is Cohen–Macaulay, but it is not reduced and therefore not regular.
2. The subring K[t^{2}, t^{3}] of the polynomial ring K[t], or its localization or completion at t=0, is a 1-dimensional domain which is Gorenstein, and hence Cohen–Macaulay, but not regular. This ring can also be described as the coordinate ring of the cuspidal cubic curve y^{2} = x^{3} over K.
3. The subring K[t^{3}, t^{4}, t^{5}] of the polynomial ring K[t], or its localization or completion at t=0, is a 1-dimensional domain which is Cohen–Macaulay but not Gorenstein.

Rational singularities over a field of characteristic zero are Cohen–Macaulay. Toric varieties over any field are Cohen–Macaulay. The minimal model program makes prominent use of varieties with klt (Kawamata log terminal) singularities; in characteristic zero, these are rational singularities and hence are Cohen–Macaulay, One successful analog of rational singularities in positive characteristic is the notion of F-rational singularities; again, such singularities are Cohen–Macaulay.

Let X be a projective variety of dimension n ≥ 1 over a field, and let L be an ample line bundle on X. Then the section ring of L

$$R=\bigoplus_{j\geq 0}H^0(X,L^j)$$

is Cohen–Macaulay if and only if the cohomology group H^{i}(X, L^{j}) is zero for all 1 ≤ i ≤ n−1 and all integers j. It follows, for example, that the affine cone Spec R over an abelian variety X is Cohen–Macaulay when X has dimension 1, but not when X has dimension at least 2 (because H^{1}(X, O) is not zero). See also Generalized Cohen–Macaulay ring.

== Cohen–Macaulay schemes ==
We say that a locally Noetherian scheme $X$ is Cohen–Macaulay if at each point $x\in X$ the local ring $\mathcal{O}_{X,x}$ is Cohen–Macaulay.

=== Cohen–Macaulay curves ===
Cohen–Macaulay curves are a special case of Cohen–Macaulay schemes, but are useful for compactifying moduli spaces of curves where the boundary of the smooth locus $\mathcal{M}_g$ is of Cohen–Macaulay curves. There is a useful criterion for deciding whether or not curves are Cohen–Macaulay. Schemes of dimension $\leq 1$ are Cohen–Macaulay if and only if they have no embedded primes. The singularities present in Cohen–Macaulay curves can be classified completely by looking at the plane curve case.

==== Non-examples ====
Using the criterion, there are easy examples of non-Cohen–Macaulay curves from constructing curves with embedded points. For example, the scheme

$$X = \text{Spec}\left( \frac{\Complex[x,y]}{(x^2,xy)} \right)$$

has the decomposition into prime ideals $(x)\cdot(x,y)$. Geometrically it is the $y$-axis with an embedded point at the origin, which can be thought of as a fat point. Given a smooth projective plane curve $C \subset \mathbb{P}^2$, a curve with an embedded point can be constructed using the same technique: find the ideal $I_x$ of a point in $x \in C$ and multiply it with the ideal $I_C$ of $C$. Then

$$X = \text{Proj}\left( \frac{\Complex[x,y,z]}{I_C \cdot I_x} \right)$$

is a curve with an embedded point at $x$.

=== Intersection theory ===
Cohen–Macaulay schemes have a special relation with intersection theory. Precisely, let X be a smooth variety and V, W closed subschemes of pure dimension. Let Z be a proper component of the scheme-theoretic intersection $V \times_X W$, that is, an irreducible component of expected dimension. If the local ring A of $V \times_X W$ at the generic point of Z is Cohen–Macaulay, then the intersection multiplicity of V and W along Z is given as the length of A:

$$i(Z, V \cdot W, X) = \operatorname{length}(A)$$.

In general, that multiplicity is given as a length essentially characterizes Cohen–Macaulay ring; see #Properties. Multiplicity one criterion, on the other hand, roughly characterizes a regular local ring as a local ring of multiplicity one.

=== Example ===
For a simple example, if we take the intersection of a parabola with a line tangent to it, the local ring at the intersection point is isomorphic to

$$\frac{\Complex[x,y]}{(y - x^2)} \otimes_{\Complex[x,y]}\frac{\Complex[x,y]}{(y)} \cong \frac{\Complex[x]}{(x^2)}$$

which is Cohen–Macaulay of length two, hence the intersection multiplicity is two, as expected.

== Miracle flatness or Hironaka's criterion ==
There is a remarkable characterization of Cohen–Macaulay rings, sometimes called miracle flatness or Hironaka's criterion. Let R be a local ring which is finitely generated as a module over some regular local ring A contained in R. Such a subring exists for any localization R at a prime ideal of a finitely generated algebra over a field, by the Noether normalization lemma; it also exists when R is complete and contains a field, or when R is a complete domain. Then R is Cohen–Macaulay if and only if it is flat as an A-module; it is also equivalent to say that R is free as an A-module.

A geometric reformulation is as follows. Let X be a connected affine scheme of finite type over a field K (for example, an affine variety). Let n be the dimension of X. By Noether normalization, there is a finite morphism f from X to affine space A^{n} over K. Then X is Cohen–Macaulay if and only if all fibers of f have the same degree. It is striking that this property is independent of the choice of f.

Finally, there is a version of Miracle Flatness for graded rings. Let R be a finitely generated commutative graded algebra over a field K,

$$R=K\oplus R_1 \oplus R_2 \oplus \cdots.$$

There is always a graded polynomial subring A ⊂ R (with generators in various degrees) such that R is finitely generated as an A-module. Then R is Cohen–Macaulay if and only if R is free as a graded A-module. Again, it follows that this freeness is independent of the choice of the polynomial subring A.

== Properties ==
- A Noetherian local ring is Cohen–Macaulay if and only if its completion is Cohen–Macaulay.
- If R is a Cohen–Macaulay ring, then the polynomial ring R[x] and the power series ring R[[x]] are Cohen–Macaulay.
- For a non-zero-divisor u in the maximal ideal of a Noetherian local ring R, R is Cohen–Macaulay if and only if R/(u) is Cohen–Macaulay.
- The quotient of a Cohen–Macaulay ring by any ideal is universally catenary.
- If R is a quotient of a Cohen–Macaulay ring, then the locus { p ∈ Spec R | R_{p} is Cohen–Macaulay } is an open subset of Spec R.
- Let (R, m, k) be a Noetherian local ring of embedding codimension c, meaning that c = dim_{k}(m/m^{2}) − dim(R). In geometric terms, this holds for a local ring of a subscheme of codimension c in a regular scheme. For c=1, R is Cohen–Macaulay if and only if it is a hypersurface ring. There is also a structure theorem for Cohen–Macaulay rings of codimension 2, the Hilbert–Burch theorem: they are all determinantal rings, defined by the r × r minors of an (r+1) × r matrix for some r.
- For a Noetherian local ring (R, m), the following are equivalent:
  1. R is Cohen–Macaulay.
  2. For every parameter ideal Q (an ideal generated by a system of parameters),
    $\operatorname{length}(R/Q) = e(Q)$ := the Hilbert–Samuel multiplicity of Q.
  3. For some parameter ideal Q, $\operatorname{length}(R/Q) = e(Q)$.

(See Generalized Cohen–Macaulay ring as well as Buchsbaum ring for rings that generalize this characterization.)

== The unmixedness theorem ==
An ideal I of a Noetherian ring A is called unmixed in height if the height of I is equal to the height of every associated prime P of A/I. (This is stronger than saying that A/I is equidimensional; see below.)

The unmixedness theorem is said to hold for the ring A if every ideal I generated by a number of elements equal to its height is unmixed. A Noetherian ring is Cohen–Macaulay if and only if the unmixedness theorem holds for it.

The unmixed theorem applies in particular to the zero ideal (an ideal generated by zero elements) and thus it says a Cohen–Macaulay ring is an equidimensional ring; in fact, in the strong sense: there is no embedded component and each component has the same codimension.

See also: quasi-unmixed ring (a ring in which the unmixed theorem holds for integral closure of an ideal).

== Counterexamples ==
1. If K is a field, then the ring R = K[x,y]/(x^{2},xy) (the coordinate ring of a line with an embedded point) is not Cohen–Macaulay. This follows, for example, by Miracle Flatness: R is finite over the polynomial ring A = K[y], with degree 1 over points of the affine line Spec A with y ≠ 0, but with degree 2 over the point y = 0 (because the K-vector space K[x]/(x^{2}) has dimension 2).
2. If K is a field, then the ring K[x,y,z]/(xy,xz) (the coordinate ring of the union of a line and a plane) is reduced, but not equidimensional, and hence not Cohen–Macaulay. Taking the quotient by the non-zero-divisor x−z gives the previous example.
3. If K is a field, then the ring R = K[w,x,y,z]/(wy,wz,xy,xz) (the coordinate ring of the union of two planes meeting in a point) is reduced and equidimensional, but not Cohen–Macaulay. To prove that, one can use Hartshorne's connectedness theorem: if R is a Cohen–Macaulay local ring of dimension at least 2, then Spec R minus its closed point is connected.

The Segre product of two Cohen–Macaulay rings need not be Cohen–Macaulay.

== Grothendieck duality ==
One meaning of the Cohen–Macaulay condition can be seen in coherent duality theory. A variety or scheme X is Cohen–Macaulay if the "dualizing complex", which a priori lies in the derived category of sheaves on X, is represented by a single sheaf. The stronger property of being Gorenstein means that this sheaf is a line bundle. In particular, every regular scheme is Gorenstein. Thus the statements of duality theorems such as Serre duality or Grothendieck local duality for Gorenstein or Cohen–Macaulay schemes retain some of the simplicity of what happens for regular schemes or smooth varieties.

== See also ==
- Ring theory
- Local rings
- Gorenstein local rings
- Wiles's proof of Fermat's Last Theorem
