= Mori Domain =

Mori Domain may refer to:

- The Mori Domain (Bungo) (森藩, Mori-han) of Bungo Province, held by the Kurushima family
- The Mori Domain (Izumo) (母里藩, Mori-han) of Izumo Province, a branch of the Matsue Domain, held by the Matsudaira family
- A Mori domain in mathematics is a type of commutative ring
