= Perfect ideal =

Type of ideal relevant for Noetherian rings

In commutative algebra, a perfect ideal is a proper ideal $I$ in a Noetherian ring $R$ such that its grade equals the projective dimension of the associated quotient ring.

$\textrm{grade}(I)=\textrm{proj}\dim(R/I).$

A perfect ideal is unmixed.

For a regular local ring $R$ a prime ideal $I$ is perfect if and only if $R/I$ is Cohen-Macaulay.

The notion of perfect ideal was introduced in 1913 by Francis Sowerby Macaulay in connection to what nowadays is called a Cohen-Macaulay ring, but for which Macaulay did not have a name for yet. As Eisenbud and Gray point out, Macaulay's original definition of perfect ideal $I$ coincides with the modern definition when $I$ is a homogeneous ideal in a polynomial ring, but may differ otherwise. Macaulay used Hilbert functions to define his version of perfect ideals.
