= Hochster–Roberts theorem =

Theorem in ring theory

In algebra, the Hochster–Roberts theorem, introduced by Melvin Hochster and Joel L. Roberts in 1974, states that rings of invariants of linearly reductive groups acting on regular rings are Cohen–Macaulay.

In other words, if V is a rational representation of a linearly reductive group G over a field k, then there exist algebraically independent invariant homogeneous polynomials $f_1, \cdots, f_d$ such that $k[V]^G$ is a free finite graded module over $k[f_1, \cdots, f_d]$.

In 1987, Jean-François Boutot proved that if a variety over a field of characteristic 0 has rational singularities then so does its quotient by the action of a reductive group; this implies the Hochster–Roberts theorem in characteristic 0 as rational singularities are Cohen–Macaulay.

In characteristic p>0, there are examples of groups that are reductive (or even finite) acting on polynomial rings whose rings of invariants are not Cohen–Macaulay.
