= Stanley decomposition =

In commutative algebra, a Stanley decomposition is a way of writing a ring in terms of polynomial subrings. They were introduced by Richard Stanley (1982).

== Definition ==
Suppose that a ring R is a quotient of a polynomial ring k[x_{1},...] over a field by some ideal. A Stanley decomposition of R is a representation of R as a direct sum (of vector spaces)

$$R = \bigoplus_\alpha x_\alpha k(X_\alpha)$$

where each x_{α} is a monomial and each X_{α} is a finite subset of the generators.

== See also ==
- Rees decomposition
- Hironaka decomposition
