= Rees decomposition =

In commutative algebra, a Rees decomposition is a way of writing a ring in terms of polynomial subrings. They were introduced by David Rees (1956).

== Definition ==
Suppose that a ring R is a quotient of a polynomial ring k[x_{1},...] over a field by some homogeneous ideal. A Rees decomposition of R is a representation of R as a direct sum (of vector spaces)

$$R = \bigoplus_\alpha \eta_\alpha k[\theta_1,\ldots,\theta_{f_\alpha}]$$

where each η_{α} is a homogeneous element and the d elements θ_{i} are a homogeneous system of parameters for R and η_{α}k[θ_{f_{α}+1},...,θ_{d}] ⊆ k[θ_{1}, θ_{f_{α}}].

== See also ==
- Stanley decomposition
- Hironaka decomposition
