= Krull–Akizuki theorem =

About extensions of one-dimensional Noetherian rings (commutative algebra)

In commutative algebra, the Krull–Akizuki theorem states the following: Let A be a one-dimensional reduced noetherian ring, K its total ring of fractions. Suppose L is a finite extension of K. If $A\subset B\subset L$ and B is reduced, then B is a noetherian ring of dimension at most one. Furthermore, for every nonzero ideal $I$ of B, $B/I$ is finite over A.

Note that the theorem does not say that B is finite over A. The theorem does not extend to higher dimension. One important consequence of the theorem is that the integral closure of a Dedekind domain A in a finite extension of the field of fractions of A is again a Dedekind domain. This consequence does generalize to a higher dimension: the Mori–Nagata theorem states that the integral closure of a noetherian domain is a Krull domain.

== Proof ==
First observe that $A\subset B\subset KB$ and KB is a finite extension of K, so we may assume without loss of generality that $L=KB$. Then $L=Kx_1+\cdots+Kx_n$ for some $x_1,\dots,x_n\in B$. Since each $x_i$ is integral over K, there exists $a_i\in A$ such that $a_ix_i$ is integral over A. Let $C=A[a_1x_1,\dots,a_nx_n]$. Then C is a one-dimensional noetherian ring, and $C\subset B\subset Q(C)$, where $Q(C)$ denotes the total ring of fractions of C. Thus we can substitute C for A and reduce to the case $L = K$.

Let $\mathfrak{p}_i$ be minimal prime ideals of A; there are finitely many of them. Let $K_i$ be the field of fractions of $A/{\mathfrak{p}_i}$ and $I_i$ the kernel of the natural map $B \to K \to K_i$. Then we have:

$A/{\mathfrak{p}_i} \subset B/{I_i} \subset K_i$ and $K\simeq\prod K_i$.

Now, if the theorem holds when A is a domain, then this implies that B is a one-dimensional noetherian domain since each $B/{I_i}$ is and since $B \simeq \prod B/{I_i}$. Hence, we reduced the proof to the case A is a domain. Let $0 \ne I \subset B$ be an ideal and let a be a nonzero element in the nonzero ideal $I \cap A$. Set $I_n = a^nB \cap A + aA$. Since $A/aA$ is a zero-dim noetherian ring; thus, artinian, there is an $l$ such that $I_n = I_l$ for all $n \ge l$. We claim

$$a^l B \subset a^{l+1}B + A.$$

Since it suffices to establish the inclusion locally, we may assume A is a local ring with the maximal ideal $\mathfrak{m}$. Let x be a nonzero element in B. Then, since A is noetherian, there is an n such that $\mathfrak{m}^{n+1} \subset x^{-1} A$ and so $a^{n+1}x \in a^{n+1}B \cap A \subset I_{n+2}$. Thus,

$$a^n x \in a^{n+1} B \cap A + A.$$

Now, assume n is a minimum integer such that $n \ge l$ and the last inclusion holds. If $n > l$, then we easily see that $a^n x \in I_{n+1}$. But then the above inclusion holds for $n-1$, contradiction. Hence, we have $n = l$ and this establishes the claim. It now follows:

$$B/{aB} \simeq a^l B/a^{l+1} B \subset (a^{l +1}B + A)/a^{l+1} B \simeq A/(a^{l +1}B \cap A).$$

Hence, $B/{aB}$ has finite length as A-module. In particular, the image of $I$ there is finitely generated and so $I$ is finitely generated. The above shows that $B/{aB}$ has dimension at most zero and so B has dimension at most one. Finally, the exact sequence $B/aB\to B/I\to (0)$ of A-modules shows that $B/I$ is finite over A. $\square$
