= Yoshiro Mori (mathematician) =

Japanese mathematician

Yoshiro Mori is a Japanese mathematician working on commutative algebra who introduced the Mori–Nagata theorem and whose work led to Mori domains in the 1970s.
