= Mori domain =

In algebra, a Mori domain, named after Yoshiro Mori by Querré (1971, 1976), is an integral domain satisfying the ascending chain condition on integral divisorial ideals. Noetherian domains and Krull domains both have this property. A commutative ring is a Krull domain if and only if it is a Mori domain and completely integrally closed. A polynomial ring over a Mori domain need not be a Mori domain. Also, the complete integral closure of a Mori domain need not be a Mori (or, equivalently, Krull) domain.
