= Analytically unramified ring =

In algebra, an analytically unramified ring is a local ring whose completion is reduced (has no nonzero nilpotent).

The following rings are analytically unramified:

- pseudo-geometric reduced ring.
- excellent reduced ring.

Chevalley (1945) showed that every local ring of an algebraic variety is analytically unramified. Schmidt (1936) gave an example of an analytically ramified reduced local ring. Krull showed that every 1-dimensional normal Noetherian local ring is analytically unramified; more precisely he showed that a 1-dimensional normal Noetherian local domain is analytically unramified if and only if its integral closure is a finite module. This prompted Zariski (1948) to ask whether a local Noetherian domain such that its integral closure is a finite module is always analytically unramified. However Nagata (1955) gave an example of a 2-dimensional normal analytically ramified Noetherian local ring. Nagata also showed that a slightly stronger version of Zariski's question is correct: if the normalization of every finite extension of a given Noetherian local ring R is a finite module, then R is analytically unramified.

There are two classical theorems of David Rees (1961) that characterize analytically unramified rings. The first says that a Noetherian local ring (R, m) is analytically unramified if and only if there are a m-primary ideal J and a sequence $n_j \to \infty$ such that $\overline{J^j} \subset J^{n_j}$, where the bar means the integral closure of an ideal. The second says that a Noetherian local domain is analytically unramified if and only if, for every finitely-generated R-algebra S lying between R and the field of fractions K of R, the integral closure of S in K is a finitely generated module over S. The second follows from the first.

== Nagata's example ==
Let K_{0} be a perfect field of characteristic 2, such as F_{2}. Let K be K_{0}({u_{n}, v_{n} : n ≥ 0}), where the u_{n} and v_{n} are indeterminates. Let T be the subring of the formal power series ring K [[x,y]] generated by K and K^{2} [[x,y]] and the element Σ(u_{n}x^{n}+ v_{n}y^{n}). Nagata proves that T is a normal local noetherian domain whose completion has nonzero nilpotent elements, so T is analytically ramified.
