= Going up and going down =

Concepts in commutative algebra

In commutative algebra, a branch of mathematics, going up and going down are terms which refer to certain properties of chains of prime ideals in integral extensions.

The phrase going up refers to the case when a chain can be extended by "upward inclusion", while going down refers to the case when a chain can be extended by "downward inclusion".

The major results are the Cohen–Seidenberg theorems, which were proved by Irvin S. Cohen and Abraham Seidenberg. These are known as the going-up and going-down theorems.

== Going up and going down ==
Let A ⊆ B be an extension of commutative rings.

The going-up and going-down theorems give sufficient conditions for a chain of prime ideals in B, each member of which lies over members of a longer chain of prime ideals in A, to be able to be extended to the length of the chain of prime ideals in A.

=== Lying over and incomparability ===
First, we fix some terminology. If $\mathfrak{p}$ and $\mathfrak{q}$ are prime ideals of A and B, respectively, such that

$$\mathfrak{q} \cap A = \mathfrak{p}$$

(note that $\mathfrak{q} \cap A$ is automatically a prime ideal of A) then we say that $\mathfrak{p}$ lies under $\mathfrak{q}$ and that $\mathfrak{q}$ lies over $\mathfrak{p}$. In general, a ring extension A ⊆ B of commutative rings is said to satisfy the lying over property if every prime ideal $\mathfrak{p}$ of A lies under some prime ideal $\mathfrak{q}$ of B.

The extension A ⊆ B is said to satisfy the incomparability property if whenever $\mathfrak{q}$ and $\mathfrak{q}'$ are distinct primes of B lying over a prime $\mathfrak{p}$ in A, then $\mathfrak{q}$ ⊈ $\mathfrak{q}'$ and $\mathfrak{q}'$ ⊈ $\mathfrak{q}$.

=== Going-up ===
The ring extension A ⊆ B is said to satisfy the going-up property if whenever

$$\mathfrak{p}_1 \subseteq \mathfrak{p}_2 \subseteq \!\!\;\cdots\cdots\cdots\!\!\, \subseteq \mathfrak{p}_n$$

is a chain of prime ideals of A and

$$\mathfrak{q}_1 \subseteq \mathfrak{q}_2 \subseteq \cdots \subseteq \mathfrak{q}_m$$

is a chain of prime ideals of B with m < n and such that $\mathfrak{q}_i$ lies over $\mathfrak{p}_i$ for 1 ≤ i ≤ m, then the latter chain can be extended to a chain

$$\mathfrak{q}_1 \subseteq \mathfrak{q}_2 \subseteq \cdots \subseteq \mathfrak{q}_m \subseteq \cdots \subseteq \mathfrak{q}_n$$

such that $\mathfrak{q}_i$ lies over $\mathfrak{p}_i$ for each 1 ≤ i ≤ n.

In (Kaplansky 1970) it is shown that if an extension A ⊆ B satisfies the going-up property, then it also satisfies the lying-over property.

=== Going-down ===
The ring extension A ⊆ B is said to satisfy the going-down property if whenever

$$\mathfrak{p}_1 \supseteq \mathfrak{p}_2 \supseteq \!\!\;\cdots\cdots\cdots\!\!\, \supseteq \mathfrak{p}_n$$

is a chain of prime ideals of A and

$$\mathfrak{q}_1 \supseteq \mathfrak{q}_2 \supseteq \cdots \supseteq \mathfrak{q}_m$$

is a chain of prime ideals of B with m < n and such that $\mathfrak{q}_i$ lies over $\mathfrak{p}_i$ for 1 ≤ i ≤ m, then the latter chain can be extended to a chain

$$\mathfrak{q}_1 \supseteq \mathfrak{q}_2 \supseteq \cdots \supseteq \mathfrak{q}_m \supseteq \cdots \supseteq \mathfrak{q}_n$$

such that $\mathfrak{q}_i$ lies over $\mathfrak{p}_i$ for each 1 ≤ i ≤ n.

There is a generalization of the ring extension case with ring morphisms. Let f : A → B be a (unital) ring homomorphism so that B is a ring extension of f(A). Then f is said to satisfy the going-up property if the going-up property holds for f(A) in B.

Similarly, if B is a ring extension of f(A), then f is said to satisfy the going-down property if the going-down property holds for f(A) in B.

In the case of ordinary ring extensions such as A ⊆ B, the inclusion map is the pertinent map.

== Going-up and going-down theorems ==
The usual statements of going-up and going-down theorems refer to a ring extension A ⊆ B:

1. (Going up) If B is an integral extension of A, then the extension satisfies the going-up property (and hence the lying over property), and the incomparability property.
2. (Going down) If B is an integral extension of A, and B is a domain, and A is integrally closed in its field of fractions, then the extension (in addition to going-up, lying-over and incomparability) satisfies the going-down property.

There is another sufficient condition for the going-down property:

- If A ⊆ B is a flat extension of commutative rings, then the going-down property holds.

Proof: Let p_{1} ⊆ p_{2} be prime ideals of A and let q_{2} be a prime ideal of B such that q_{2} ∩ A = p_{2}. We wish to prove that there is a prime ideal q_{1} of B contained in q_{2} such that q_{1} ∩ A = p_{1}. Since A ⊆ B is a flat extension of rings, it follows that A_{p_{2}} ⊆ B_{q_{2}} is a flat extension of rings. In fact, A_{p_{2}} ⊆ B_{q_{2}} is a faithfully flat extension of rings since the inclusion map A_{p_{2}} → B_{q_{2}} is a local homomorphism. Therefore, the induced map on spectra Spec(B_{q_{2}}) → Spec(A_{p_{2}}) is surjective and there exists a prime ideal of B_{q_{2}} that contracts to the prime ideal p_{1}A_{p_{2}} of A_{p_{2}}. The contraction of this prime ideal of B_{q_{2}} to B is a prime ideal q_{1} of B contained in q_{2} that contracts to p_{1}. The proof is complete. Q.E.D.
