= Hironaka decomposition =

Representation of an algebra as a free module

In mathematics, a Hironaka decomposition is a representation of an algebra over a field as a finitely generated free module over a polynomial subalgebra or a regular local ring. Such decompositions are named after Heisuke Hironaka, who used this in his unpublished master's thesis at Kyoto University (Nagata 1962, p.217).

Hironaka's criterion (Nagata 1962, theorem 25.16), sometimes called the miracle flatness theorem, states that a local ring R that is a finitely generated module over a regular Noetherian local ring S is Cohen–Macaulay if and only if it is a free module over S. There is a similar result for rings that are graded over a field rather than local.

== Explicit decomposition of an invariant algebra ==
Let $V$ be a finite-dimensional vector space over an algebraically closed field of characteristic zero, $K$, carrying a representation of a group $G$, and consider the polynomial algebra on $V$, $K[V]$. The algebra $K[V]$ carries a grading with $(K[V])_0 = K$, which is inherited by the invariant subalgebra

$$K[V]^G = \{ f \in K[V] \mid g \circ f = f, \forall g \in G \}$$.

A famous result of invariant theory, which provided the answer to Hilbert's fourteenth problem, is that if $G$ is a linearly reductive group and $V$ is a rational representation of $G$, then $K[V]$ is finitely-generated. Another important result, due to Noether, is that any finitely-generated graded algebra $R$ with $R_0 = K$ admits a (not necessarily unique) homogeneous system of parameters (HSOP). A HSOP (also termed primary invariants) is a set of homogeneous polynomials, $\{ \theta_i \}$, which satisfy two properties:

1. The $\{ \theta_i \}$ are algebraically independent.
2. The zero set of the $\{ \theta_i \}$, $\{v \in V | \theta_i = 0\}$, coincides with the nullcone (link) of $R$.

Importantly, this implies that the algebra can then be expressed as a finitely-generated module over the subalgebra generated by the HSOP, $K[\theta_1, \dots, \theta_l]$. In particular, one may write

$$K[V]^G = \sum_{k} \eta_k K[\theta_1, \dots, \theta_l]$$,

where the $\eta_k$ are called secondary invariants.

Now if $K[V]^G$ is Cohen–Macaulay, which is the case if $G$ is linearly reductive, then it is a free (and as already stated, finitely-generated) module over any HSOP. Thus, one in fact has a Hironaka decomposition

$$K[V]^G = \bigoplus_{k} \eta_k K[\theta_1, \dots, \theta_l]$$.

In particular, each element in $K[V]^G$ can be written uniquely as 􏰐$\sum\nolimits_j \eta_j f_j$, where $f_j \in K[\theta_1, \dots, \theta_l]$, and the product of any two secondaries is uniquely given by $\eta_k \eta_m = \sum\nolimits_j \eta_j f^j_{km}$, where $f^j_{km} \in K[\theta_1, \dots, \theta_l]$. This specifies the multiplication in $K[V]^G$ unambiguously.

== See also ==
- Rees decomposition
- Stanley decomposition
