= Cohen structure theorem =

In mathematics, the Cohen structure theorem, introduced by Cohen (1946), describes the structure of complete Noetherian local rings.

Some consequences of Cohen's structure theorem include three conjectures of Krull:

- Any complete regular equicharacteristic Noetherian local ring is a ring of formal power series over a field. (Equicharacteristic means that the local ring and its residue field have the same characteristic, and is equivalent to the local ring containing a field.)
- Any complete regular Noetherian local ring that is not equicharacteristic but is unramified is uniquely determined by its residue field and its dimension.
- Any complete Noetherian local ring is the image of a complete regular Noetherian local ring.

== Statement ==
The most commonly used case of Cohen's theorem is when the complete Noetherian local ring contains some field. In this case Cohen's structure theorem states that the ring is of the form k[[x_{1},...,x_{n}]]/(I) for some ideal I, where k is its residue class field.

In the unequal characteristic case when the complete Noetherian local ring does not contain a field, Cohen's structure theorem states that the local ring is a quotient of a formal power series ring in a finite number of variables over a Cohen ring with the same residue field as the local ring. A Cohen ring is a field or a complete characteristic zero discrete valuation ring whose maximal ideal is generated by a prime number p (equal to the characteristic of the residue field).

In both cases, the hardest part of Cohen's proof is to show that the complete Noetherian local ring contains a coefficient ring (or coefficient field), meaning a complete discrete valuation ring (or field) with the same residue field as the local ring.
