= Integral closure of an ideal =

In algebra, the integral closure of an ideal $I$ of a commutative ring $R$, denoted by $\overline{I}$, is the set of all elements r in $R$ that are integral over $I$: that is, for each $i$ there exists $a_i \in I^i$ such that

$$r^n + a_1 r^{n-1} + \cdots + a_{n-1} r + a_n = 0.$$

In other words, $r$ is a zero of a certain kind of monic polynomial. This integral closure is similar to the integral closure of a subring. For example, if $R$ is a domain, an element r in $R$ belongs to $\overline{I}$ if and only if there is a finitely generated $R$-module $M$, annihilated only by zero, such that $r M \subseteq I M$. It follows that $\overline{I}$ is an ideal of $R$ (in fact, the integral closure of an ideal is always an ideal; see below). $I$ is said to be integrally closed if $I = \overline{I}$.

The integral closure of an ideal appears in a theorem of Rees that characterizes an analytically unramified ring.

== Examples ==
- In $\mathbb{C}[x, y]$, $x^i y^{d-i}$ is integral over $(x^d, y^d)$. It satisfies the equation $r^{d} + (-x^{di} y^{d(d-i)}) = 0$, where $a_d=-x^{di}y^{d(d-i)}$ is in the $d$th power of the ideal.
- Radical ideals (e.g., prime ideals) are integrally closed. The intersection of integrally closed ideals is integrally closed.
- In a normal ring, for any non-zerodivisor x and any ideal $I$, $\overline{xI} = x \overline{I}$. In particular, in a normal ring, a principal ideal generated by a non-zerodivisor is integrally closed.
- Let $R = k[X_1, \ldots, X_n]$ be a polynomial ring over a field k. An ideal $I$ in $R$ is called monomial if it is generated by monomials; i.e., $X_1^{a_1} \cdots X_n^{a_n}$. The integral closure of a monomial ideal is monomial.

== Structure results ==
Let $R$ be a ring. The Rees algebra $R[It] = \oplus_{n \ge 0} I^n t^n$ can be used to compute the integral closure of an ideal. The structure result is the following: the integral closure of $R[It]$ in $R[t]$, which is graded, is $\oplus_{n \ge 0} \overline{I^n} t^n$. In particular, $\overline{I}$ is an ideal and $\overline{I} = \overline{\overline{I}}$; i.e., the integral closure of an ideal is integrally closed. It also follows that the integral closure of a homogeneous ideal is homogeneous.

The following type of results is called the Briancon–Skoda theorem: let $R$ be a regular ring and I an ideal generated by l elements. Then $\overline{I^{n+l}} \subset I^{n+1}$ for any $n \ge 0$.

A theorem of Rees states: let $(R, m)$ be a noetherian local ring. Assume it is formally equidimensional (i.e., the completion is equidimensional.). Then two m-primary ideals $I \subset J$ have the same integral closure if and only if they have the same multiplicity.

== See also ==
- Dedekind–Kummer theorem
