= Almost commutative ring =

In algebra, a filtered ring A is said to be almost commutative if the associated graded ring $\operatorname{gr}A = \oplus A_i/{A_{i-1}}$ is commutative.

Basic examples of almost commutative rings involve differential operators. For example, the enveloping algebra of a complex Lie algebra is almost commutative by the PBW theorem. Similarly, a Weyl algebra is almost commutative.

== See also ==
- Ore condition
- Gelfand–Kirillov dimension
