= Grade (ring theory) =

Invariant for finitely generated modules over a Noetherian ring

In commutative and homological algebra, the grade of a finitely generated module $M$ over a Noetherian ring $R$ is a cohomological invariant defined by vanishing of Ext-modules

$\textrm{grade}\,M=\textrm{grade}_R\,M=\inf\left\{i\in\mathbb{N}_0:\textrm{Ext}_R^i(M,R)\neq 0\right\}.$

For an ideal $I\triangleleft R$ the grade is defined via the quotient ring viewed as a module over $R$

$\textrm{grade}\,I=\textrm{grade}_R\,I=\textrm{grade}_R\,R/I=\inf\left\{i\in\mathbb{N}_0:\textrm{Ext}_R^i(R/I,R)\neq 0\right\}.$

The grade is used to define perfect ideals. In general we have the inequality

$\textrm{grade}_R\,I\leq\textrm{proj}\dim(R/I)$

where the projective dimension is another cohomological invariant.

The grade is tightly related to the depth, since

$\textrm{grade}_R\,I=\textrm{depth}_{I}(R).$

Under the same conditions on $R, I$ and $M$ as above, one also defines the $M$-grade of $I$ as

$\textrm{grade}_M\,I=\inf\left\{i\in\mathbb{N}_0:\textrm{Ext}_R^i(R/I,M)\neq 0\right\}.$

This notion is tied to the existence of maximal $M$-sequences contained in $I$ of length $\textrm{grade}_M\,I$.
