= Abraham Seidenberg =

American mathematician (1916–1988)

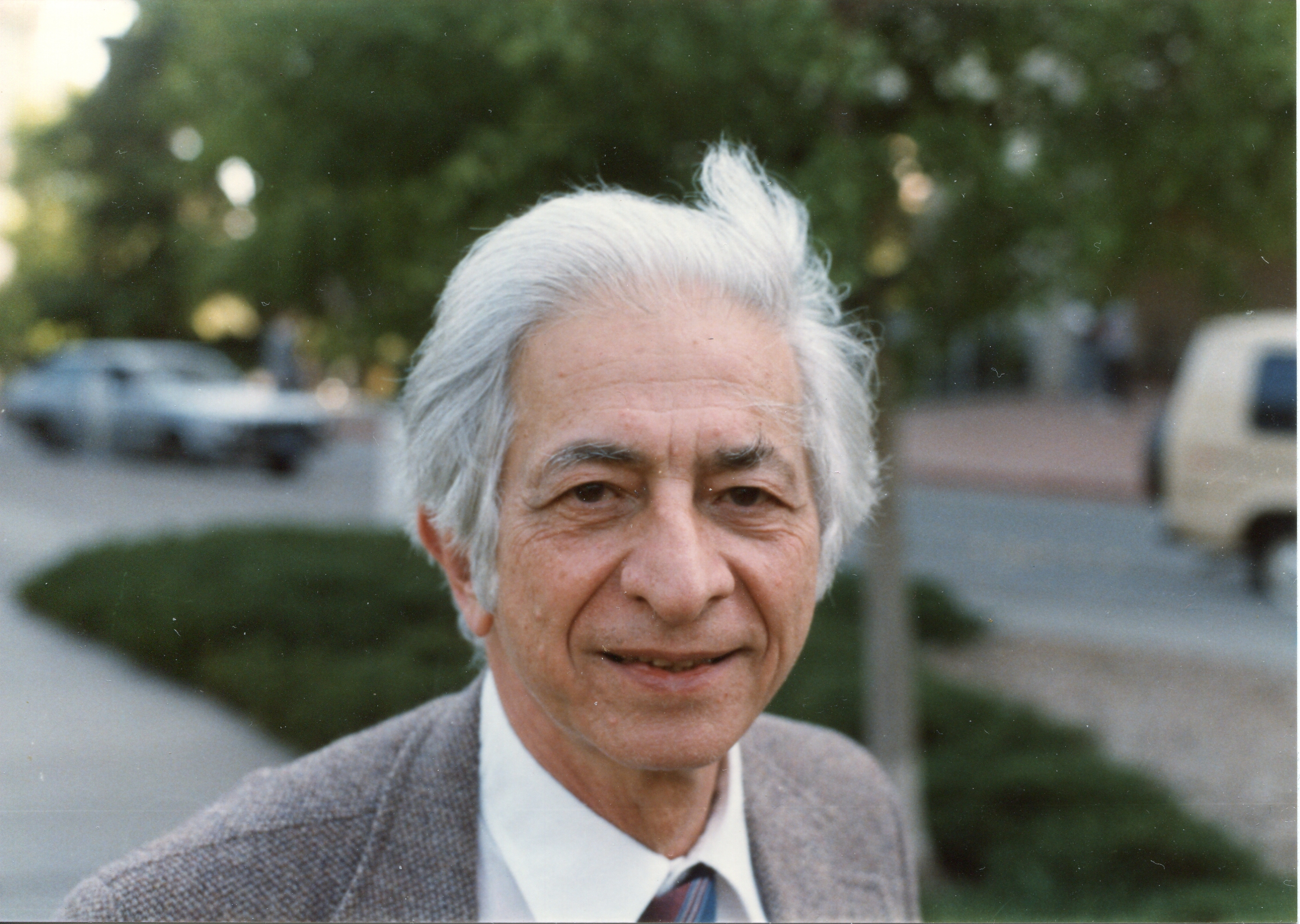
- Born: June 2, 1916; Washington D.C., U.S.
- Died: May 3, 1988 (aged 71); Milan, Italy
- Education: Johns Hopkins University; University of Maryland
- Known for: Tarski–Seidenberg theorem
- Spouse: Ebe Cagli
- Scientific career
- Fields: Mathematics
- Workplaces: University of California, Berkeley
- Thesis: Valuation Ideals in Rings of Polynomials in Two Variables (1943)
- Doctoral advisor: Oscar Zariski

Abraham Seidenberg (June 2, 1916 – May 3, 1988) was an American mathematician.

== Early life ==
Seidenberg was born on June 2, 1916, to Harry and Fannie Seidenberg in Washington D.C. He graduated with a B.A. from the University of Maryland in 1937. He completed his Ph.D. in mathematics from Johns Hopkins University in 1943. His Ph.D. thesis, written under the direction of Oscar Zariski, was on Valuation Ideals in Rings of Polynomials in Two Variables.

== Academic career ==
Seidenberg became an instructor in mathematics at the University of California, Berkeley, in 1945. He reached the rank of full professor in 1958. He retired from Berkeley in 1987.

== Contributions ==
Seidenberg was known for his research in commutative algebra, algebraic geometry, differential algebra, and the history of mathematics. He published Prime ideals and integral dependence written jointly with Irvin Cohen, which greatly simplified the existing proofs of the going-up and going-down theorems of ideal theory. He also made important contributions to algebraic geometry. In 1950, he published a paper called The hyperplane sections of normal varieties, which has proved fundamental in later advances. In 1968, he wrote Elements of the theory of algebraic curves, a book on algebraic geometry. He published several other important papers.

== Personal life ==
Seidenberg married Ebe Cagli. She was a writer, and the sister of Yole Cagli, Zariski's wife. Ebe and her family immigrated to the United States from Italy. The couple frequently visited Italy and Seidenberg held a visiting professorship at the University of Milan.

== Death ==
Seidenberg died on May 3, 1988, in Milan, Italy. At the time of his death, he was in the midst of series of lectures at the University of Milan.
