= Mori–Nagata theorem =

Theorem in commutative algebra

In algebra, the Mori–Nagata theorem introduced by Yoshiro Mori (1953) and Nagata (1955), states the following: let A be a noetherian reduced commutative ring with the total ring of fractions K. Then the integral closure of A in K is a direct product of r Krull domains, where r is the number of minimal prime ideals of A.

The theorem is a partial generalization of the Krull–Akizuki theorem, which concerns a one-dimensional noetherian domain. A consequence of the theorem is that if R is a Nagata ring, then every R-subalgebra of finite type is again a Nagata ring (Nishimura 1976).

The Mori–Nagata theorem follows from Matijevic's theorem. (McAdam 1990)
