= Equidimensionality =

Property of a space in which the local dimensionality is the same everywhere

In mathematics, the term equidimensional is used to indicate a particular property of a space or relation, though the exact meaning may vary by subfield. In topology, equidimensionality is a property of a space that the local dimension is the same everywhere. In the classification of differential equations like the Cauchy-Euler equation, an equation is called equidimensional when rescaling an independent or dependent coordinate leaves the equation unchanged.

== Definition (topology) ==
A topological space X is said to be equidimensional if for all points p in X, the dimension at p, that is dim p(X), is constant. The Euclidean space is an example of an equidimensional space. The disjoint union of two spaces X and Y (as topological spaces) of different dimension is an example of a non-equidimensional space.

== Definition (algebraic geometry) ==
A scheme S is said to be equidimensional if every irreducible component has the same Krull dimension. For example, the affine scheme Spec k[x,y,z]/(xy,xz), which intuitively looks like a line intersecting a plane, is not equidimensional.

An affine algebraic variety whose coordinate ring is a Cohen–Macaulay ring is equidimensional.

== Definition (differential equations) ==
A differential equation is said to be equidimensional if it is independent of the scale of measurement of one or more of its variables. For example, consider the first-order homogeneous ordinary differential equation

$$x \frac{dy}{dx} + y = 0.$$

If we introduce a new function $z(t)$ such that $y(x) = \alpha z(\beta x)$, then $dy/dx = \alpha \beta \partial z/\partial t$ and

$$t \frac{\partial z}{\partial t} + z = 0.$$

Since this is equivalent to the differential equation we started with, we say that it is an equidimensional equation in both the independent variable $x$ and the dependent-variable $y$.

The third-order ordinary differential equation

$$y''' y' y - 2 y (y'')^2  + (y')^2 y'' = 0$$

is also equidimensional in both its independent and dependent variables. All homogeneous linear differential equations are equidimensional in their dependent variable. All Cauchy-Euler equations are equidimensional in both variables. In this context, the equidimensional label indicates the equation is the same under any rescaling of the units of that variable. Equidimensional equations play an important rule in dimensional analysis.
