= Cohen ring =

In algebra, a Cohen ring is a field or a complete discrete valuation ring of mixed characteristic $(0, p)$ whose maximal ideal is generated by p. Cohen rings are used in the Cohen structure theorem for complete Noetherian local rings.

== See also ==
- Norm field
