= Dedekind–Kummer theorem =

Theorem in algebraic number theory

In algebraic number theory, the Dedekind–Kummer theorem describes how a prime ideal in a Dedekind domain factors over the domain's integral closure. It is named after Richard Dedekind who developed the theorem based on the work of Ernst Kummer.

== Statement for number fields ==
Let $K$ be a number field and $\mathcal O_K$ the ring of algebraic integers in $K$. Let $\alpha \in \mathcal O_K$ be such that $\mathbb{Q}[\alpha]=K$ and $f$ be the minimal polynomial of $\alpha$ over $\Z[x]$. For any prime $p$ not dividing the index $[\mathcal O_K : \Z[\alpha]]$, write
$$f(x) \equiv \pi_1 (x)^{e_1} \cdots \pi_g(x)^{e_g} \mod p,$$
where $\pi_i (x)$ are monic irreducible polynomials in $\mathbb F_p[x]$. Then, the ideal $(p) = p \mathcal O_K$ factors into prime ideals as
$$(p) = \mathfrak p_1^{e_1} \cdots \mathfrak p_g^{e_g}$$
such that $N(\mathfrak p_i) = p^{\deg \pi_i}$, where $N$ is the ideal norm.

== Statement for Dedekind domains ==
The Dedekind-Kummer theorem holds more generally than in the situation of number fields: Let $\mathcal o$ be a Dedekind domain contained in its quotient field $K$, $L/K$ a finite, separable field extension with $L=K[\theta]$ for a suitable generator $\theta$ and $\mathcal O$ the integral closure of $\mathcal o$. The above situation is just a special case as one can choose $\mathcal o = \Z, K=\Q, \mathcal O = \mathcal O_L$).

If $(0)\neq\mathfrak p\subseteq\mathcal o$ is a prime ideal coprime to the conductor $\mathfrak F=\{a\in \mathcal O\mid a\mathcal O\subseteq\mathcal o[\theta]\}$ (i.e. their sum is $\mathcal O$). Consider the minimal polynomial $f\in \mathcal o[x]$ of $\theta$. The polynomial $\overline f\in(\mathcal o / \mathfrak p)[x]$ has the decomposition
$$\overline f=\overline{f_1}^{e_1}\cdots \overline{f_r}^{e_r}$$
with pairwise distinct irreducible polynomials $\overline{f_i}$. The factorization of $\mathfrak p$ into prime ideals over $\mathcal O$ is then given by
$$\mathfrak p=\mathfrak P_1^{e_1}\cdots \mathfrak P_r^{e_r}$$
where $\mathfrak P_i=\mathfrak p\mathcal O+(f_i(\theta)\mathcal O)$ and the $f_i$ are the polynomials $\overline{f_i}$ lifted to $\mathcal o[x]$.
