= Krull ring =

Commutative ring with a well behaved theory of prime factorization

In commutative algebra, a Krull ring, or Krull domain, is a commutative ring with a well behaved theory of prime factorization. They were introduced by Wolfgang Krull in 1931. They are a higher-dimensional generalization of Dedekind domains, which are exactly the Krull domains of dimension at most 1.

In this article, a ring is commutative and has unity.

== Formal definition ==
Let $A$ be an integral domain and let $P$ be the set of all prime ideals of $A$ of height one, that is, the set of all prime ideals properly containing no nonzero prime ideal. Then $A$ is a Krull ring if

1. $A_{\mathfrak{p}}$ is a discrete valuation ring for all $\mathfrak{p} \in P$,
2. $A$ is the intersection of these discrete valuation rings (considered as subrings of the quotient field of $A$),
3. any nonzero element of $A$ is contained in only a finite number of height 1 prime ideals.

It is also possible to characterize Krull rings by mean of valuations only:

An integral domain $A$ is a Krull ring if there exists a family $\{ v _ {i} \} _ {i \in I }$ of discrete valuations on the field of fractions $K$ of $A$ such that:

1. for any $x \in K \setminus \{ 0 \}$ and all $i$, except possibly a finite number of them, $v _ {i} ( x) = 0$,
2. for any $x \in K \setminus \{ 0 \}$, $x$ belongs to $A$ if and only if $v _ {i} ( x) \geq 0$ for all $i \in I$.

The valuations $v_i$ are called essential valuations of $A$.

The link between the two definitions is as follows: for every $\mathfrak p\in P$, one can associate a unique normalized valuation $v_{\mathfrak p}$ of $K$ whose valuation ring is $A_{\mathfrak p}$. Then the set $\mathcal V = \{v_{\mathfrak p}\}$ satisfies the conditions of the equivalent definition. Conversely, if the set $\mathcal V' = \{v_i\}$ is as above, and the $v_i$ have been normalized, then $\mathcal V'$ may be bigger than $\mathcal V$, but it must contain $\mathcal V$. In other words, $\mathcal V$ is the minimal set of normalized valuations satisfying the equivalent definition.

== Properties ==
With the notations above, let $v_{\mathfrak p}$ denote the normalized valuation corresponding to the valuation ring $A_{\mathfrak p}$, $U$ denote the set of units of $A$, and $K$ its quotient field.

- An element $x \in K$ belongs to $U$ if, and only if, $v_{\mathfrak p} (x) = 0$ for every $\mathfrak p \in P$. Indeed, in this case, $x \not\in A_{\mathfrak p}\mathfrak p$ for every $\mathfrak p\in P$, hence $x^{-1} \in A_{\mathfrak p}$; by the intersection property, $x^{-1}\in A$. Conversely, if $x$ and $x^{-1}$ are in $A$, then $v_{\mathfrak p} (xx^{-1}) = v_{\mathfrak p} (1) = 0 = v_{\mathfrak p} (x) + v_{\mathfrak p} (x^{-1})$, hence $v_{\mathfrak p} (x) = v_{\mathfrak p} (x^{-1}) = 0$, since both numbers must be $\geq 0$.
- An element $x \in A$ is uniquely determined, up to a unit of $A$, by the values $v_{\mathfrak p} (x)$, $\mathfrak p \in P$. Indeed, if $v_{\mathfrak p} (x) = v_{\mathfrak p} (y)$ for every $\mathfrak p \in P$, then $v_{\mathfrak p} (xy^{-1}) = 0$, hence $xy^{-1}\in U$ by the above property (q.e.d). This shows that the application $x\ {\rm mod}\ U\mapsto \left(v_{\mathfrak p}(x) \right)_{\mathfrak p \in P}$ is well defined, and since $v_{\mathfrak p}(x)\not = 0$ for only finitely many $\mathfrak p$, it is an embedding of $A^{\times}/U$ into the free Abelian group generated by the elements of $P$. Thus, using the multiplicative notation "$\cdot$" for the later group, there holds, for every $x\in A^\times$, $x = 1\cdot \mathfrak p_1^{\alpha_1}\cdot\mathfrak p_2^{\alpha_2}\cdots \mathfrak p_n^{\alpha_n}\ {\rm mod}\ U$, where the $\mathfrak p_i$ are the elements of $P$ containing $x$, and $\alpha_i = v_{\mathfrak p_i} (x)$.
- The valuations $v_{\mathfrak p}$ are pairwise independent. As a consequence, there holds the so-called weak approximation theorem, an homologue of the Chinese remainder theorem: if $\mathfrak p_1, \ldots \mathfrak p_n$ are distinct elements of $P$, $x_1,\ldots x_n$ belong to $K$ (resp. $A_{\mathfrak p}$), and $a_1, \ldots a_n$ are $n$ natural numbers, then there exist $x\in K$ (resp. $x\in A_{\mathfrak p}$) such that $v_{\mathfrak p_i} (x - x_i) = n_i$ for every $i$.
- A consequence of the weak approximation theorem is a characterization of when Krull rings are noetherian; namely, a Krull ring $A$ is noetherian if and only if all of its quotients $A/{\mathfrak p}$ by height-1 primes are noetherian.
- Two elements $x$ and $y$ of $A$ are coprime if $v_{\mathfrak p} (x)$ and $v_{\mathfrak p} (y)$ are not both $> 0$ for every $\mathfrak p\in P$. The basic properties of valuations imply that a good theory of coprimality holds in $A$.
- Every prime ideal of $A$ contains an element of $P$.
- Any finite intersection of Krull domains whose quotient fields are the same is again a Krull domain.
- If $L$ is a subfield of $K$, then $A\cap L$ is a Krull domain.
- If $S\subset A$ is a multiplicatively closed set not containing 0, the ring of quotients $S^{-1}A$ is again a Krull domain. In fact, the essential valuations of $S^{-1}A$ are those valuation $v_{\mathfrak p}$ (of $K$) for which $\mathfrak p \cap S = \emptyset$.
- If $L$ is a finite algebraic extension of $K$, and $B$ is the integral closure of $A$ in $L$, then $B$ is a Krull domain.

== Examples ==
1. Any unique factorization domain is a Krull domain. Conversely, a Krull domain is a unique factorization domain if (and only if) every prime ideal of height one is principal.
2. Every integrally closed noetherian domain is a Krull domain. In particular, Dedekind domains are Krull domains. Conversely, Krull domains are integrally closed, so a Noetherian domain is Krull if and only if it is integrally closed.
3. If $A$ is a Krull domain then so is the polynomial ring $A[x]$ and the formal power series ring $A[[x]]$.
4. The polynomial ring $R[x_1, x_2, x_3, \ldots]$ in infinitely many variables over a unique factorization domain $R$ is a Krull domain which is not noetherian.
5. Let $A$ be a Noetherian domain with quotient field $K$, and $L$ be a finite algebraic extension of $K$. Then the integral closure of $A$ in $L$ is a Krull domain (Mori–Nagata theorem).
6. Let $A$ be a Zariski ring (e.g., a local noetherian ring). If the completion $\widehat{A}$ is a Krull domain, then $A$ is a Krull domain (Mori).
7. Let $A$ be a Krull domain, and $V$ be the multiplicatively closed set consisting in the powers of a prime element $p\in A$. Then $S^{-1}A$ is a Krull domain (Nagata).

== The divisor class group of a Krull ring ==
Assume that $A$ is a Krull domain and $K$ is its quotient field. A prime divisor of $A$ is a height 1 prime ideal of $A$. The set of prime divisors of $A$ will be denoted $P(A)$ in the sequel. A (Weil) divisor of $A$ is a formal integral linear combination of prime divisors. They form an Abelian group, noted $D(A)$. A divisor of the form $div(x)=\sum_{p\in P}v_p(x)\cdot p$, for some non-zero $x$ in $K$, is called a principal divisor. The principal divisors of $A$ form a subgroup of the group of divisors (it has been shown above that this group is isomorphic to $A^\times /U$, where $U$ is the group of unities of $A$). The quotient of the group of divisors by the subgroup of principal divisors is called the divisor class group of $A$; it is usually denoted $C(A)$.

Assume that $B$ is a Krull domain containing $A$. As usual, we say that a prime ideal $\mathfrak P$ of $B$ lies above a prime ideal $\mathfrak p$ of $A$ if $\mathfrak P\cap A = \mathfrak p$; this is abbreviated in $\mathfrak P|\mathfrak p$.

Denote the ramification index of $v_{\mathfrak P}$ over $v_{\mathfrak p}$ by $e(\mathfrak P,\mathfrak p)$, and by $P(B)$ the set of prime divisors of $B$. Define the application $P(A)\to D(B)$ by

$$j(\mathfrak p) = \sum_{\mathfrak P|\mathfrak p,\ \mathfrak P\in P(B)} e(\mathfrak P, \mathfrak p) \mathfrak P$$

(the above sum is finite since every $x\in \mathfrak p$ is contained in at most finitely many elements of $P(B)$). Let extend the application $j$ by linearity to a linear application $D(A)\to D(B)$. One can now ask in what cases $j$ induces a morphism $\bar j:C(A)\to C(B)$. This leads to several results. For example, the following generalizes a theorem of Gauss:

The application $\bar j:C(A)\to C(A[X])$ is bijective. In particular, if $A$ is a unique factorization domain, then so is $A[X]$.

The divisor class group of a Krull rings are also used to set up powerful descent methods, and in particular the Galoisian descent.

== Cartier divisor ==
A Cartier divisor of a Krull ring is a locally principal (Weil) divisor. The Cartier divisors form a subgroup of the group of divisors containing the principal divisors. The quotient of the Cartier divisors by the principal divisors is a subgroup of the divisor class group, isomorphic to the Picard group of invertible sheaves on Spec(A).

Example: in the ring k[x,y,z]/(xy–z^{2}) the divisor class group has order 2, generated by the divisor y=z, but the Picard subgroup is the trivial group.
