= System of parameters =

Mathematical concept in dimension theory of local rings

In mathematics, a system of parameters for a local Noetherian ring of Krull dimension d with maximal ideal m is a set of elements x_{1}, ..., x_{d} that satisfies any of the following equivalent conditions:

1. m is a minimal prime over (x_{1}, ..., x_{d}).
2. The radical of (x_{1}, ..., x_{d}) is m.
3. Some power of m is contained in (x_{1}, ..., x_{d}).
4. (x_{1}, ..., x_{d}) is m-primary.
5. R/(x_{1}, ..., x_{d}) is an Artinian ring.

Every local Noetherian ring admits a system of parameters.

It is not possible for fewer than d elements to generate an ideal whose radical is m because then the dimension of R would be less than d.

If M is a k-dimensional module over a local ring, then x_{1}, ..., x_{k} is a system of parameters for M if the length of M / (x_{1}, ..., x_{k}) M is finite.

== General references ==
- Atiyah, Michael Francis; Macdonald, I. G. (1969), Introduction to Commutative Algebra, Addison-Wesley Publishing Co., Reading, Mass.-London-Don Mills, Ont., MR 0242802
- Eisenbud, David (1995), Commutative Algebra, Springer-Verlag, New York, MR 1322960
