= Jacobson ring =

In algebra, a Hilbert ring or a Jacobson ring is a ring such that every prime ideal is an intersection of primitive ideals. For commutative rings, primitive ideals are the same as maximal ideals so in this case a Jacobson ring is one in which every prime ideal is an intersection of maximal ideals.

Jacobson rings were introduced independently by Wolfgang Krull (1951, 1952), who named them after Nathan Jacobson because of their relation to Jacobson radicals, and by Oscar Goldman (1951), who named them Hilbert rings after David Hilbert because of their relation to Hilbert's Nullstellensatz.

== Jacobson rings and the Nullstellensatz ==
Hilbert's Nullstellensatz of algebraic geometry is a special case of the statement that the polynomial ring in finitely many variables over a field is a Hilbert ring. A general form of the Nullstellensatz states that if R is a Jacobson ring, then so is any finitely generated R-algebra S. Moreover, the pullback of any maximal ideal J of S is a maximal ideal I of R, and S/J is a finite extension of the field R/I.

In particular a morphism of finite type of Jacobson rings induces a morphism of the maximal spectra of the rings. This explains why for algebraic varieties over fields it is often sufficient to work with the maximal ideals rather than with all prime ideals, as was done before the introduction of schemes. For more general rings such as local rings, it is no longer true that morphisms of rings induce morphisms of the maximal spectra, and the use of prime ideals rather than maximal ideals gives a cleaner theory.

== Examples ==
- Any field is a Jacobson ring.
- Any principal ideal domain or Dedekind domain with Jacobson radical zero is a Jacobson ring. In principal ideal domains and Dedekind domains, the nonzero prime ideals are already maximal, so the only thing to check is if the zero ideal is an intersection of maximal ideals. Asking for the Jacobson radical to be zero guarantees this. In principal ideal domains and Dedekind domains, the Jacobson radical vanishes if and only if there are infinitely many prime ideals.
- Any finitely generated algebra over a Jacobson ring is a Jacobson ring. In particular, any finitely generated algebra over a field or the integers, such as the coordinate ring of any affine algebraic set, is a Jacobson ring.
- A local ring has exactly one maximal ideal, so it is a Jacobson ring exactly when that maximal ideal is the only prime ideal. Thus any commutative local ring with Krull dimension zero is Jacobson, but if the Krull dimension is 1 or more, the ring cannot be Jacobson.
- (Amitsur 1956) showed that any countably generated algebra over an uncountable field is a Jacobson ring.
- Tate algebras over non-archimedean fields are Jacobson rings.
- A commutative ring R is a Jacobson ring if and only if R[x], the ring of polynomials over R, is a Jacobson ring.

== Characterizations ==
The following conditions on a commutative ring R are equivalent:

- R is a Jacobson ring
- Every prime ideal of R is an intersection of maximal ideals.
- Every radical ideal is an intersection of maximal ideals.
- Every Goldman ideal is maximal.
- Every quotient ring of R by a prime ideal has a zero Jacobson radical.
- In every quotient ring, the nilradical is equal to the Jacobson radical.
- Every finitely generated algebra over R that is a field is finitely generated as an R-module. (Zariski's lemma)
- Every prime ideal P of R such that R/P has an element x with (R/P)[x^{−1}] a field is a maximal prime ideal.
- The spectrum of R is a Jacobson space, meaning that every closed subset is the closure of the set of closed points in it.
- (For Noetherian rings R): R has no prime ideals P such that R/P is a 1-dimensional semi-local ring.
