= George Yuri Rainich =

American physicist (1886–1968)

- Джордж Юрий Райнич
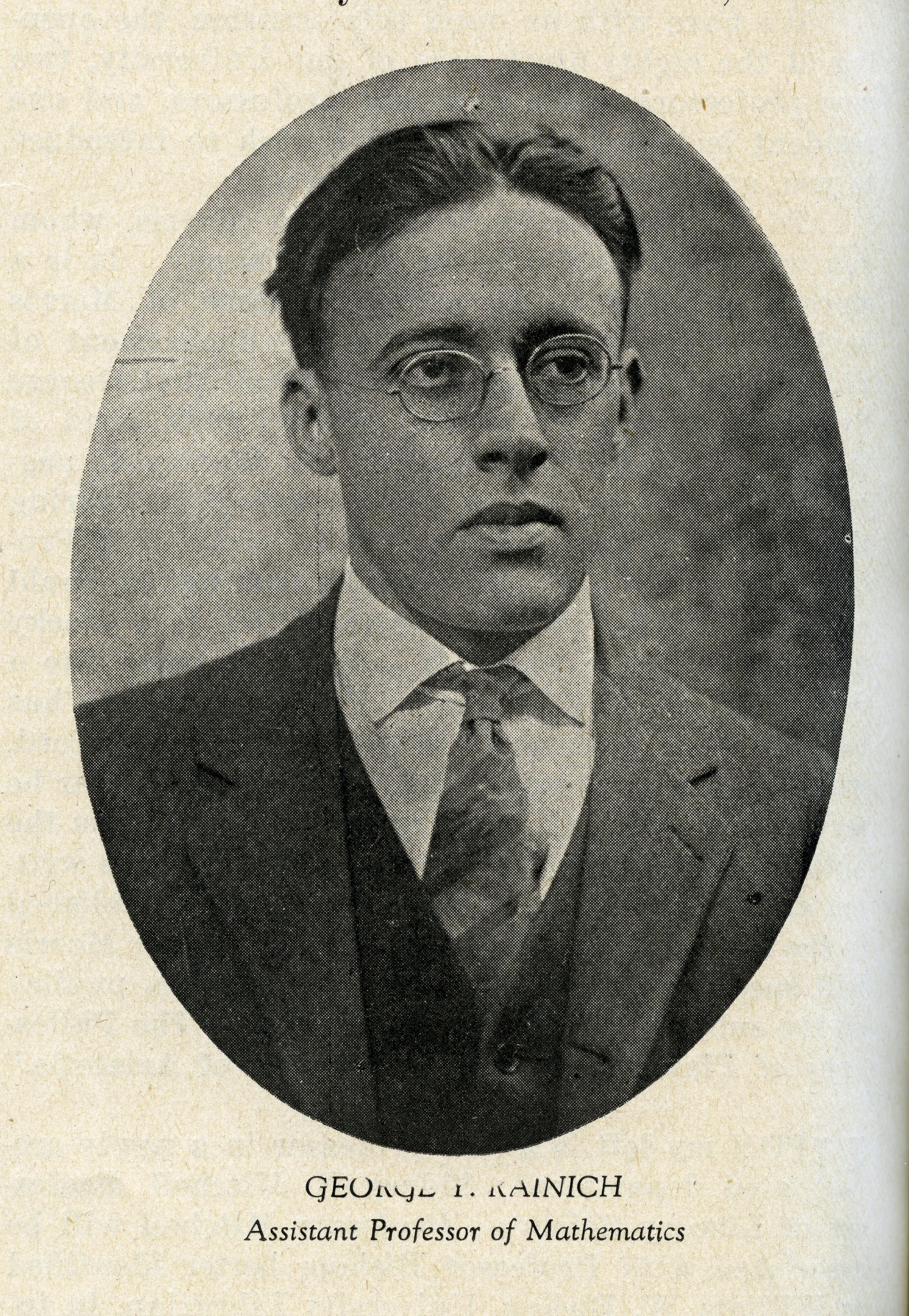
- Rainich in 1926
- Born: Yuri Germanovich Rabinovich; March 25, 1886; Odesa, Russian Empire (now Ukraine)
- Died: October 10, 1968 (aged 82); United States

George Yuri Rainich (Note: Russian: Джордж Юрий Райнич, romanized: Dzhordzh Yury Raynich) (March 25, 1886 – October 10, 1968, born Yuri Germanovich Rabinovich) (Note: Russian: Юрий Германович Рабинович, romanized: Yury Germanovich Rabinovich) was a leading mathematical physicist in the early twentieth century.

== Career ==
Rainich studied mathematics from 1904 to 1908 in Odessa, in Göttingen (1905–1906), and in Munich (1906–1907), eventually obtaining his doctorate (Magister of Pure Mathematics) in 1913 from the University of Kazan. After teaching at the University of Kazan, he emigrated with his wife to the United States in 1922 via Istanbul. After three years at Johns Hopkins University, he joined the faculty of the University of Michigan, where he remained until his retirement in 1956. After his retirement as professor emeritus, he was in 1957 at Brown University as a member of the editorial staff of Mathematical Reviews and he was for several years a visiting professor at the University of Notre Dame. After the death of his wife in 1963, he returned to the University of Michigan at Ann Arbor and organized there a seminar on general relativity theory for physicists and mathematicians.

Rainich's research centered on general relativity and early work toward a unified field theory. In 1924, Rainich found a set of equivalent conditions for a Lorentzian manifold to admit an interpretation as an exact non-null electrovacuum solution in general relativity; these are now known as the Rainich conditions.

According to some sources, Peter Gabriel Bergmann brought Rainich's suggestion that algebraic topology (and knot theory in particular) should play a role in physics to the attention of John Archibald Wheeler, which shortly led to the Ph.D. thesis of Charles W. Misner. Another version of this tale replaces Bergmann with Hugh Everett, who was a fellow student of Misner at the time.

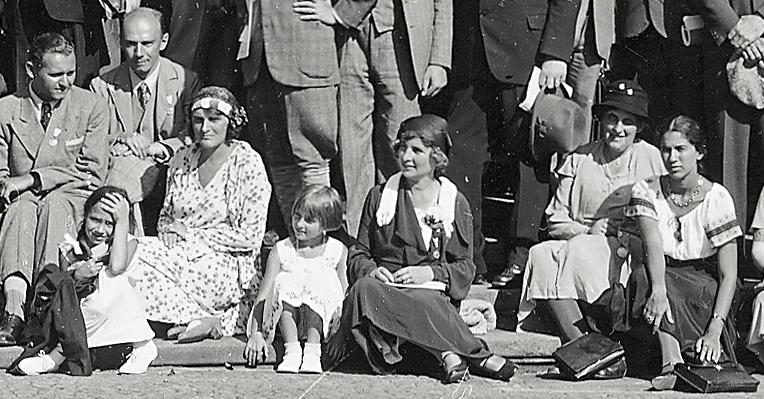
Mrs. Rainich (bottom row, left) accompanied George Yuri Rainich (not on the photo) at the ICM 1932.

According to the Editor of The American Mathematical Monthly, Rainich is the inventor of the Rabinowitsch trick, a clever argument to deduce the Hilbert Nullstellensatz from an easier special case. It is later explained that Rainich was born Rabinowitsch, hence the Pseudonym. This claim is, however, disputed.

Rainich, as Georg Rabinowitsch, proved new results on Euler's prime-generating polynomial.

Rainich was an Invited Speaker at the ICM in 1928 at Bologna (with talk On a Spacetime possessing the symmetry properties of radiation) and in 1932 at Zürich. He also gave a talk (concerning his results on the Euler prime-generating polynomial) at the ICM in 1912 at Cambridge, England. From 1933 to 1936 he was a member of the council (advising the board of trustees) of the American Mathematical Society.

Rainich's private papers are held at the University of Texas.

== Personal life ==
In 1917 he married Sophie Kramkowsky. In 1930 he brought his mother from the Soviet Union to Ann Arbor, where she remained until her death in 1953. Upon his death he was survived by a daughter, two grandchildren, and a brother, Michael Rabinovich of Moscow.

Yuri had an abiding interest in not only classical but modern linguistics. It was part of the Rainich folklore that he could read anything published in Europe.

== Students ==
Several of Rainich's Ph.D. students became famous:

- Ruel Vance Churchill (12 December 1899 - 31 October 1987) is well known to several generations of mathematics students as a coauthor of a standard textbook known as "Churchill & Brown."
- Marjorie Lee Browne (9 September 1914 – 19 October 1979) was one of the first African-American women to receive a doctoral degree in mathematics in the U.S.
- Wade Ellis (June 9, 1909 – November 20, 1989), mathematician and educator, and the twelfth African-American to receive a doctorate in mathematics in the U.S.
- "Tommy" Charles Brown Tompkins (1912 – 1971) was a mathematics professor at UCLA and a pioneer in numerical analysis and computing.

== Selected articles ==
- Rainich, G. Y. (June 1923). "Tensor Analysis Without Coördinates". Proc Natl Acad Sci U S A. 9 (6): 179–183. Bibcode:1923PNAS....9..179R. doi:10.1073/pnas.9.6.179. PMC 1085323. PMID 16576694.
- Rainich, G. Y. (December 1923). "A New Kind of Representation of Surfaces". Proc Natl Acad Sci U S A. 9 (12): 401–403. Bibcode:1923PNAS....9..401R. doi:10.1073/pnas.9.12.401. PMC 1085468. PMID 16586916.
- Rainich, G. Y. (1930). "On a decomposition of a quaternary quadratic form". Bull. Amer. Math. Soc. 36 (2): 107–111. doi:10.1090/S0002-9904-1930-04899-5. MR 1561899.
- Rainich, G. Y. (1931). "Analytic functions and mathematical physics". Bull. Amer. Math. Soc. 37 (10): 689–714. doi:10.1090/S0002-9904-1931-05241-1. MR 1562240.
- with Otto Laporte: Laporte, Otto; Rainich, G. Y. (1936). "Stereographic parameters and pseudo-minimal hypersurfaces". Trans. Amer. Math. Soc. 39 (1): 154–182. doi:10.2307/1989649. JSTOR 1989649. MR 1501839.
- with Herbert Boggs: Boggs, Herbert; Rainich, G. Y. (1937). "Note on group postulates". Bull. Amer. Math. Soc. 43 (2): 81–84. doi:10.1090/S0002-9904-1937-06498-6. MR 1563491.
- Rainich, G. Y. (1936). "Spinors and tensors". Bull. Amer. Math. Soc. 42 (2): 104–106. doi:10.1090/S0002-9904-1936-06248-8. MR 1563250.
- Rainich, G. Y. (15 July 1941). "Conditional Invariants". Proc Natl Acad Sci U S A. 27 (7): 352–355. Bibcode:1941PNAS...27..352R. doi:10.1073/pnas.27.7.352. PMC 1078338. PMID 16578018.
- Rainich, G. Y. (15 July 1941). "The Dirac Equation and Conditional Invariants". Proc Natl Acad Sci U S A. 27 (7): 355–358. Bibcode:1941PNAS...27..355R. doi:10.1073/pnas.27.7.355. PMC 1078339. PMID 16578019.
