= Constructibility =

Constructibility or constructability may refer to:

- Constructability or construction feasibility review, a process in construction design whereby plans are reviewed by others familiar with construction techniques and materials to assess whether the design is actually buildable
- Constructible strategy game, a tabletop strategy game employing pieces assembled from components

== Mathematics ==
- Compass-and-straightedge construction
- Constructible point, a point in the Euclidean plane that can be constructed with compass and straightedge
- Constructible number, a complex number associated to a constructible point
- Constructible polygon, a regular polygon that can be constructed with compass and straightedge
- Constructible sheaf, a certain kind of sheaf of abelian groups
- Constructible set (topology), a finite union of locally closed sets
- Constructible topology, a topology on the spectrum of a commutative ring y in which every closed set is the image of Spec(B) in Spec(A) for some algebra B over A
- Constructible universe, Kurt Gödel's model L of set theory, constructed by transfinite recursion
- Constructible function, a function whose values can be computed in a number of steps or a number of Turing-machine cells of order given by the function itself
