= Earl D. Rainville =

American mathematician (1907–1966)

Professor Earl David Rainville (5 November 1907 – 29 April 1966) taught in the Department of Engineering Mathematics at the University of Michigan, where he began as an assistant professor in 1941. He studied at the University of Colorado Boulder, receiving his B.A. there in 1930 before going on to graduate studies at Michigan, where he received his Ph.D. in 1939 under the supervision of Ruel Churchill.

He was the author of several textbooks.

== Books ==
- Linear Differential Invariance Under an Operator Related to the Laplace Transformation, University of Michigan, 1940, reprinted from American Journal of Mathematics, volume 62. (Rainville's Ph.D. thesis.)
- Intermediate Course in Differential Equations, Chapman & Hall, 1943.
- Analytic Geometry, with Clyde E. Love, Macmillan, 1955.
- Special Functions, Macmillan, 1960.
- Unified Calculus and Analytic Geometry, Macmillan, 1961.
- Differential and Integral Calculus, with Clyde E. Love, Macmillan, 1962.
- Laplace Transform: An Introduction, 1963.
- Intermediate Differential Equations, Macmillan, 1964.
- Infinite Series, Macmillan, 1967.
- Elementary Differential Equations, with Phillip E. Bedient, Macmillan, 1969. Eighth edition published by Prentice Hall, 1997, ISBN 0-13-508011-8.
- A Short Course in Differential Equations, with Phillip E. Bedient, Macmillan, 1969.

== See also ==
- Rainville polynomials
