= Goldman domain =

In mathematics, a Goldman domain or G-domain is an integral domain A whose field of fractions is a finitely generated algebra over A. They are named after Oscar Goldman.

An overring (i.e., an intermediate ring lying between the ring and its field of fractions) of a Goldman domain is again a Goldman domain. There exists a Goldman domain where all nonzero prime ideals are maximal although there are infinitely many prime ideals.

An ideal I in a commutative ring A is called a Goldman ideal if the quotient A/I is a Goldman domain. A Goldman ideal is thus prime, but not necessarily maximal. In fact, a commutative ring is a Jacobson ring if and only if every Goldman ideal in it is maximal.

The notion of a Goldman ideal can be used to give a slightly sharpened characterization of a radical of an ideal: the radical of an ideal I is the intersection of all Goldman ideals containing I.

== Alternative definition ==
An integral domain $D$ is a G-domain if and only if:

1. Its field of fractions is a simple extension of $D$
2. The intersection of its nonzero prime ideals (not to be confused with nilradical) is nonzero
3. There is a nonzero element $u$ such that for any nonzero ideal $I$, $u^n \in I$ for some $n$.

A G-ideal is defined as an ideal $I \subset R$ such that $R/I$ is a G-domain. Since a factor ring is an integral domain if and only if the ring is factored by a prime ideal, every G-ideal is also a prime ideal. G-ideals can be used as a refined collection of prime ideals in the following sense: the radical of an ideal can be characterized as the intersection of all prime ideals containing the ideal, and in fact we still get the radical even if we take the intersection over the G-ideals.

Every maximal ideal is a G-ideal, since quotient by maximal ideal is a field, and a field is trivially a G-domain. Therefore, maximal ideals are G-ideals, and G-ideals are prime ideals. G-ideals are the only maximal ideals in a Jacobson ring, and in fact this is an equivalent characterization of Jacobson rings: a ring is a Jacobson ring when all G-ideals are maximal ideals. This leads to a simplified proof of the Nullstellensatz.

It is known that given $T \supset R$, a ring extension of a G-domain, $T$ is algebraic over $R$ if and only if every ring extension between $T$ and $R$ is a G-domain.

A Noetherian domain is a G-domain if and only if its Krull dimension is at most one, and has only finitely many maximal ideals (or equivalently, prime ideals).
