= Oscar Goldman =

Oscar Goldman may refer to:

- Oscar Goldman (character), a character in the TV series The Six Million Dollar Man and The Bionic Woman
- Oscar Goldman (mathematician), American mathematician
