= Constructible set =

In mathematics, constructible set may refer to either:

- a notion in Gödel's constructible universe
- Constructible set (topology), a class of subsets of a topological space
