= Ruel Vance Churchill =

American mathematician (1899–1987)

Ruel Vance Churchill (12 December 1899 – 31 October 1987) was an American mathematician and author known for writing three widely used textbooks on applied mathematics.

Churchill was born in Akron, Indiana in 1899, and in 1922 he received his undergraduate degree from the University of Chicago. In 1929 he received his PhD from the University of Michigan under George Rainich with thesis On the Geometry of the Riemann Tensor. He spent his entire career as a member of the U. of Michigan mathematics faculty and retired in 1965 as professor emeritus. His doctoral students include Earl D. Rainville.

Churchill died in Ann Arbor, Michigan in 1987.

== Books ==
- Complex Variables and Applications, McGraw-Hill, 1st edition 1948, 2nd edition 1960, The 3rd (1974) and later editions were co-authored with James Ward Brown
- Fourier Series and Boundary Value Problems, McGraw-Hill, 1941, 2nd edition 1963
- Modern Operational Mathematics in Engineering, McGraw-Hill, 1944
- Operational Mathematics, McGraw-Hill, 1958, 2nd edition of the 1944 book but with a new title, 3rd edition 1972

== Selected articles ==
- Churchill, R. V. (1932). "On the geometry of the Riemann tensor". Trans. Amer. Math. Soc. 34 (1): 126–152. doi:10.1090/s0002-9947-1932-1501632-1. MR 1501632.
- Churchill, R. V. (1932). "Canonical forms for symmetric linear vector functions in pseudo-Euclidean space". Trans. Amer. Math. Soc. 34 (4): 784–794. doi:10.1090/s0002-9947-1932-1501663-1. MR 1501663.
- Churchill, R. V. (1942). "Expansions in series of non-orthogonal functions". Bull. Amer. Math. Soc. 48 (2): 143–149. doi:10.1090/s0002-9904-1942-07628-2. MR 0005940.
- with R. C. F. Bartels: Bartels, R. C. F.; Churchill, R. V. (1942). "Resolution of boundary problems by the use of a generalized convolutin". Bull. Amer. Math. Soc. 48 (4): 276–282. doi:10.1090/s0002-9904-1942-07655-5. MR 0005994.
- with C. L. Dolph: Churchill, R. V.; Dolph, C. L. (1954). "Inverse transforms of Legendre transforms". Proc. Amer. Math. Soc. 5: 93–100. doi:10.1090/s0002-9939-1954-0062872-4. MR 0062872.
