= Representation on coordinate rings =

In mathematics, a representation on coordinate rings is a representation of a group on coordinate rings of affine varieties.

Let X be an affine algebraic variety over an algebraically closed field k of characteristic zero with the action of a reductive algebraic group G. G then acts on the coordinate ring $k[X]$ of X as a left regular representation: $(g \cdot f)(x) = f(g^{-1} x)$. This is a representation of G on the coordinate ring of X.

The most basic case is when X is an affine space (that is, X is a finite-dimensional representation of G) and the coordinate ring is a polynomial ring. The most important case is when X is a symmetric variety; i.e., the quotient of G by a fixed-point subgroup of an involution.

== Isotypic decomposition ==
Let $k[X]_{(\lambda)}$ be the sum of all G-submodules of $k[X]$ that are isomorphic to the simple module $V^{\lambda}$; it is called the $\lambda$-isotypic component of $k[X]$. Then there is a direct sum decomposition:

$$k[X] = \bigoplus_{\lambda} k[X]_{(\lambda)}$$

where the sum runs over all simple G-modules $V^{\lambda}$. The existence of the decomposition follows, for example, from the fact that the group algebra of G is semisimple since G is reductive.

X is called multiplicity-free (or spherical variety) if every irreducible representation of G appears at most one time in the coordinate ring; i.e., $\operatorname{dim} k[X]_{(\lambda)} \le \operatorname{dim} V^{\lambda}$. For example, $G$ is multiplicity-free as $G \times G$-module. More precisely, given a closed subgroup H of G, define

$$\phi_{\lambda}: V^{{\lambda}*} \otimes (V^{\lambda})^H \to k[G/H]_{(\lambda)}$$

by setting $\phi_{\lambda}(\alpha \otimes v)(gH) = \langle \alpha, g \cdot v \rangle$ and then extending $\phi_{\lambda}$ by linearity. The functions in the image of $\phi_{\lambda}$ are usually called matrix coefficients. Then there is a direct sum decomposition of $G \times N$-modules (N the normalizer of H)

$$k[G/H] = \bigoplus_{\lambda} \phi_{\lambda}(V^{{\lambda}*} \otimes (V^{\lambda})^H)$$,

which is an algebraic version of the Peter–Weyl theorem (and in fact the analytic version is an immediate consequence.) Proof: let W be a simple $G \times N$-submodules of $k[G/H]_{(\lambda)}$. We can assume $V^{\lambda} = W$. Let $\delta_1$ be the linear functional of W such that $\delta_1(w) = w(1)$. Then $w(gH) = \phi_{\lambda}(\delta_1 \otimes w)(gH)$. That is, the image of $\phi_{\lambda}$ contains $k[G/H]_{(\lambda)}$ and the opposite inclusion holds since $\phi_{\lambda}$ is equivariant.

== Examples ==
- Let $v_{\lambda} \in V^{\lambda}$ be a B-eigenvector and X the closure of the orbit $G \cdot v_\lambda$. It is an affine variety called the highest weight vector variety by Vinberg–Popov. It is multiplicity-free.

== See also ==
- Algebra representation
