= Serre's theorem on affineness =

In the mathematical discipline of algebraic geometry, Serre's theorem on affineness (also called Serre's cohomological characterization of affineness or Serre's criterion on affineness) is a theorem due to Jean-Pierre Serre which gives sufficient conditions for a scheme to be affine, stated in terms of sheaf cohomology. The theorem was first published by Serre in 1957.

== Statement ==
Let X be a scheme with structure sheaf O_{X}. If:

(1) X is quasi-compact, and
(2) for every quasi-coherent ideal sheaf I of O_{X}-modules, H^{1}(X, I) = 0, (Note: Some texts, such as Ueno (2001, pp. 128–133), require that H^{i}(X,I) = 0 for all i ≥ 1 as a condition for the theorem. In fact, this is equivalent to condition (2) above.)

then X is affine.

== Related results ==
- A special case of this theorem arises when X is an algebraic variety, in which case the conditions of the theorem imply that X is an affine variety.
- A similar result has stricter conditions on X but looser conditions on the cohomology: if X is a quasi-separated, quasi-compact scheme, and if H^{1}(X, I) = 0 for any quasi-coherent sheaf of ideals I of finite type, then X is affine.

== Bibliography ==
- Hartshorne, Robin (1977), Algebraic Geometry, Graduate Texts in Mathematics, vol. 52, New York: Springer-Verlag, ISBN 978-0-387-90244-9, MR 0463157
- Serre, Jean-Pierre (1957). "Sur la cohomologie des variétés algébriques". J. Math. Pures Appl. Series 9. 36: 1–16. Zbl 0078.34604.
- The Stacks Project authors. "Section 29.3 (01XE):Vanishing of cohomology—The Stacks Project".
- The Stacks Project authors. "Lemma 29.3.1 (01XF)—The Stacks Project".
- Ueno, Kenji (2001). Algebraic Geomety II: Sheaves and Cohomology. Translations of Mathematical Monographs. Vol. 197. AMS. ISBN 978-0-8218-1357-7.
