= Spectrum of a ring =

Set of a ring's prime ideals

In mathematics, and more specifically in commutative algebra and algebraic geometry, the prime spectrum (or simply the spectrum) of a commutative ring $R$ is the set of all prime ideals of $R,$ equipped with a topology called the Zariski topology. The spectrum of a commutative ring is naturally endowed with a sheaf of commutative rings, called the structure sheaf, which makes it a ringed space; that is, commutative rings are associated to every point and every open set, which satisfy some compatibility conditions. The structure formed by the spectrum of a commutative ring and the associated ringed space is called an affine scheme. The spectrum of a ring $R$ and the associated affine scheme are both denoted by $\operatorname{Spec}{R}$ or $\operatorname{Spec}(R)$.

Affine schemes are a basic tool of modern algebraic geometry, and specifically scheme theory. Indeed, schemes are built by "gluing together" affine schemes in a way that is very similar to the construction of manifolds by gluing together open subsets of a Euclidean space equipped with the ring of the continuous functions over them. The adjective "affine" in the phrase "affine scheme" comes from the fact that an affine algebraic variety can be identified with the affine scheme built over its ring of regular functions.

For the related, more general notion of prime and maximal spectra of lattices, see Ideal (order theory) § Prime and maximal spectra.

== Historical motivation ==
The idea of the spectrum of a ring was introduced under that name by Alexander Grothendieck. It brought together several parallel historical threads. One, which motivates the use of the word "spectrum", comes from linear algebra and more general functional analysis, in which the spectrum is used to denote the eigenvalues of a linear transformation. The other came from commutative algebra, in which a topological space (the Zariski topology) had been in use to describe the structure of prime ideals. The final synthesis was the addition of a structure sheaf, which encodes local geometric information near each prime ideal.

The first motivation comes from linear algebra. An endomorphism $T$ of a finite-dimensional complex vector space $V$ generates the subring $\mathbb C[T]$ of the ring of the endomorphisms of $V$. This ring is commutative, and there is a surjective canonical ring homomorphism $\C[x] \to \C[T]$ that maps $x$ to $T$, where $\C[x]$ is the univariate polynomial ring. The kernel of this homomorphism is the principal ideal generated by the minimal polynomial $m_T(x)$ of $T.$ The polynomial $m_T(x)$ factors into prime factors of the form $(x-\lambda_i)$ where the $\lambda_i$ are the eigenvalues of $T.$ This establishes a bijective correspondence between the eigenvalues of $T$ and the primes ideals of $\mathbb C[T].$ This allows identifying the spectrum of an endomorphism with the spectrum of a specific ring.

One missing ingredient in the notion of spectrum is that it does not distinguish the multiplicity of the various eigenvalues. Thus the definition of a ring spectrum includes not only the bare set of prime ideals, but also structural information, carried by the ring $\C[T]$, that allows for the determination of multiplicity (and other kinds of geometric properties). For example, a non-zero nilpotent operator has only zero as an eigenvalue, and the minimal polynomial $m_T(x) = x^k$ where $k>1$, but the spectrum as a point set is the singleton $\{(x)\}$, the prime ideal containing $x$, independently of the nilpotent degree $k$.

The modern notion of a spectrum thus includes a structure sheaf, which consists of a prescription of the functions that lie over each of the prime ideals. In the case of $\mathbb C[x]/(x^k)$, the point set of the spectrum is the singleton $\{(x)\},$ but the nilpotent degree is encoded by the stalk of the structure sheaf at this point, $\mathcal O_{(x)} = \mathbb C[x]/(x^k)$.

This linear algebra notion of spectrum was already widely used in the broader subject of spectral theory. In a unital complex Banach algebra $A$, the idea is extended by defining the spectrum of an element $a$ to be the set of complex numbers $\lambda$ such that $a-\lambda 1$ is not invertible. In the commutative case, Israel Gelfand's theory of normed rings and Banach algebras made the space of maximal ideals, or equivalently multiplicative linear functionals, into a central object of study.

The prime spectrum of a commutative ring also has a separate origin in commutative algebra and algebraic geometry. For an affine algebraic variety over an algebraically closed field, the Nullstellensatz identifies ordinary points with maximal ideals in its coordinate ring. More generally, irreducible subvarieties correspond to prime ideals. Passing from maximal ideals to all prime ideals therefore amounts to adjoining a generic point for each irreducible subvariety.

The work of Wolfgang Krull anticipated the use of geometric points to describe prime ideals. His 1928 paper on chains of prime ideals was part of the development of dimension theory in general rings. A related topological use of prime ideals appeared in Marshall Stone's work on Boolean algebras and distributive lattices: Stone introduced a topology on prime ideals of a distributive lattice, producing what is now called the spectrum of the lattice and leading to the notion of a spectral space.

The modern construction of $\operatorname{Spec}(R)$ as a locally ringed space was introduced systematically by Alexander Grothendieck in scheme theory. In this form, the spectrum is not only a topological space of prime ideals, but is equipped with a structure sheaf, allowing affine schemes to be glued to form general schemes.

== Zariski topology ==
As a set, the spectrum $\operatorname{Spec}(R)$ of a commutative ring is the set of the prime ideals of $R$. It is made a topological space, with each prime ideal $\mathfrak{p}\in\operatorname{Spec}(R)$ being a point in this space, by equipping it with the Zariski topology, the topology for which a closed set is the set of all prime ideals containing a given subset of $R$. In other words, for every subset $S$ of $R$, let
$$V_S=\{\mathfrak{p}\in\operatorname{Spec}(R):\mathfrak{p}\supseteq S\}.$$
The set of all $V_S$ form the closed sets of the Zariski topology on $\operatorname{Spec}(R).$ One gets exactly the same closed sets if one restricts the definition to subsets $I$ that are ideals, since $V_I=V_S$ if $I=(S)$, the ideal generated by $S$. In fact, only radical ideals need to be considered, as $V_I=V_{\sqrt{I}}$ for any ideal $I$ and its radical $\sqrt{I}.$

Given a closed set $V\subseteq \mathrm{Spec}(R)$, the ideal
$$J=\bigcap_{\mathfrak p \in V}\mathfrak p$$
is a radical ideal such that $V_J=V$. This establishes a one-to-one correspondence between closed sets and radical ideals. This corresponds, in algebraic geometry, to the correspondence between an algebraic set and the set all polynomial equations that are satisfied on it (see Hilbert's Nullstellensatz for details).

Among the open sets, that is the sets of the form $\operatorname{Spec}(R)\setminus V_I,$ some are especially important: those of the form
$$D_f=\mathrm{Spec}(R)\setminus V_{(f)}=\{\mathfrak p\in\mathrm{Spec}(R): f\not\in \mathfrak p\},$$
so that $I$ is taken to be a principal ideal generated by some $f\in R;$ they are sometimes called the distinguished open sets or principal open sets. One has always
$$D_f\cap D_g= D_{fg}.$$
Since every open set is of the form $U=\mathrm{Spec}(R)\setminus V_I=\bigcup_{f\in I} D_f,$ the principal open sets form a basis for the Zariski topology. It follows that there is generally no harm to consider only open sets of the form $D_f$. The importance of the $D_f$ lies mainly in the fact that, when an ideal $I$ is not principal, the open set $\operatorname{Spec}(R)\setminus V_I$ is not easy to define in terms of the generators of the ideal.

$\operatorname{Spec}(R)$ is a compact space, but almost never Hausdorff: (Note: The algebraic geometry literature usually refers to a space that is compact (in the general topology sense of every open cover having a finite subcover) without necessarily being Hausdorff (e.g., $\operatorname{Spec}(R)$ in most cases) as being quasi-compact, while calling a space compact only when it is both quasi-compact and Hausdorff.) In fact, the maximal ideals in $R$ are precisely the closed points in this topology. By the same reasoning, $\operatorname{Spec}(R)$ is not, in general, a T_{1} space. However, $\operatorname{Spec}(R)$ is always a Kolmogorov space (satisfies the T_{0} axiom); it is also a spectral space.

== Affine schemes ==
=== Construction of the structure sheaf ===
For every commutative ring $R$, the topological space $X=\operatorname{Spec}(R)$ is naturally endowed with a sheaf of commutative rings, called its structural sheaf and commonly denoted $\mathcal O_X$. This makes $\operatorname{Spec}(R)$ a ringed space, called an affine scheme and also denoted $\operatorname{Spec}(R)$.

A sheaf of rings $\mathcal O_X$ over a topological space $X$ consists of a family of rings $\mathcal O_X(U)$ (alternative notation: $\Gamma(U,\mathcal{O}_X)$) indexed by the open sets $U$ of $X$. For each inclusion $U\subset V$ of open sets, there is a canonical ring homomorphism $\mathcal O_X(V) \to \mathcal O_X(U)$. These canonical homomorphisms must satisfy some compatibility conditions.

The first compatibility condition is that the canonical homomorphisms behave as expected with respect to composition of inclusions. This means that if $\mathcal U$ is the category of the open sets with inclusions as morphisms, $\mathcal O_X$ is a contravariant functor from $\mathcal U$ to the category of rings.

The second compatibility condition is that $\mathcal O_X(U)$ can be uniquely recovered from the $\mathcal O_X(U_i)$ if $\textstyle U= \bigcup_{i\in C}U_i$ is an open cover of $U$. Technically, this can be expressed as
$$\mathcal O_X(U)=\varprojlim_{i\in C}U_i,$$
where $\varprojlim$ denotes an inverse limit.

In the case of an affine scheme $X=\operatorname{Spec}(R)$, the ring $\mathcal O_X(U)$ is first defined for principal open sets of the form $D_f$ as the localization
$$\mathcal O_X(D_f)=R_f=S^{-1}R,$$
where $S= \{1,f,f^2,f^3,\dots\}$ is the set of the integer powers of $f$. One observes that $D_g\subseteq D_f \iff g\in\sqrt{(f)},$ so that $g^n=rf$ for some positive integer $n$ and $r \in R$, and $f$ is invertible in $R_g$. This allows the canonical homomorphism $\mathcal O_X(D_f) \to \mathcal O_X(D_g)$ to be defined as the localization $R_f \to R_g$ mapping $a/f^m \mapsto ar^m/g^{nm}.$

For the other open sets, $\mathcal O_X(U)$ is defined as
$$\mathcal O_X(U)= \varprojlim_{D_f \subseteq U}R_f,$$
and the canonical ring homomorphisms are defined accordingly. These definitions, for open sets that are possibly not principal open sets, are rarely used in practice, except for proving that these definitions define effectively a sheaf of rings.

For a ringed space $(X,\mathcal O_X)$, the stalk at a point $x$ is the direct limit
$$\mathcal{O}_{X,x}= \varinjlim_{U\ni x} \mathcal O_X(U),$$
where $U$ runs over the open sets of $X$ containing $x$. In the case of an affine scheme $X=\operatorname{Spec}(R)$, the stalk $\mathcal{O}_{X,\mathfrak{p}}$ at a point $\mathfrak p \in X$ is the local ring $R_\mathfrak p$. Therefore, an affine scheme is a locally ringed space. The elements of a stalk are called germs. A germ at $x$ captures the local, infinitesimal behavior of an element of $\mathcal{O}_X(U)$ around $x$.

=== Sections of the structure sheaf ===
The elements of $\mathcal O_X(U)$ are known as sections of the structure sheaf over $U$. The ring of sections $\mathcal O_X(U)$ for an affine scheme $X$ can be thought of as a generalization of the ring of regular functions over open subset $T \subseteq V$ of an affine variety $V\subseteq k^N$ ($k=\overline{k}$ an algebraically closed field), and sections $s\in\mathcal{O}_X(U)$ can be thought of as generalizations of regular functions; i.e., functions $f:T\to k$ such that for every $p\in T$, there is an open subset $W\subseteq T$ containing $p$ so that $f(w)=g(w)/h(w)$ for some $g, h\in k[V],\ h(w)\neq 0,$ for all $w\in W.$ Here, $k[V]$ is the ring of polynomial functions on $V$, known as its coordinate ring; if $\operatorname{I}(V)$ is the ideal of all polynomials that are zero on $V$, then $k[V]=k[x_1,\dots, x_N]/\operatorname{I}(V).$ The rings of regular functions over open subsets of an affine variety, in fact, form a sheaf of $k$-algebras, which is called the structure sheaf of the variety. The structure sheaf of affine schemes generalizes this construction; for details, see Affine variety § Structure sheaf.

Two fundamental facts from the theory of affine varieties inform what the ring of global sections of an affine scheme should be: 1) the ring of global regular functions $f:V\to k$ of affine variety $V$ is just the coordinate ring $k[V];$ 2) the Nullstellensatz establishes a one-to-one correspondence between the points of an affine variety $V$ and the maximal ideals of its coordinate ring $k[V]$. Thus, the coordinate ring $k[V]$ gives us all of the allowed global functions on $V$, while its set of maximal ideals $\operatorname{MaxSpec}(k[V])$ could be identified with $V$ itself. By considering arbitrary commutative rings instead of only coordinate rings (i.e., reduced, finitely generated $k$-algebras) and taking all prime ideals of a ring, not just maximal ones, these facts motivate defining the ring of global sections of affine scheme $\operatorname{Spec}(R)$ to simply be $R$: $\mathcal{O}_{\operatorname{Spec}(R)}(\operatorname{Spec}(R))=R.$

In the general case, the sections of a structure sheaf of an affine scheme $X=\operatorname{Spec}(R)$ cannot be regarded as true "functions". Nonetheless, it is useful to think of an element $f\in\mathcal{O}_X(X)=R$ as an object that behaves analogously to a "function" on $X$ by defining its value at $\mathfrak{p}$ in the field of fractions $\operatorname{Frac}(R/\mathfrak{p})$ as

$$f(\mathfrak{p})=\frac{f \operatorname{mod} \mathfrak{p}}{1}.$$

For the special case of the polynomial ring $R=\mathbb{C}[x]$ with spectrum $\operatorname{Spec}(R)=\{(x-a):a\in\mathbb{C}\}\cup\{(0)\},$ evaluation of $f\in R$ at maximal ideal $\mathfrak{m}_a = (x-a)$ under this definition corresponds to polynomial evaluation at $a,$ i.e., $\mathfrak{m}_a\mapsto f(a),$ consistent with the identification $\mathfrak{m}_a\leftrightarrow a$ via the Nullstellensatz and the usual interpretation of polynomials as functions $\mathbb{C}\to\mathbb{C}.$

This assignment of a value to $f(\mathfrak{p})$ allows us to rewrite the definition of a principal open subset of $X$ as

$$D_f=\{\mathfrak{p}\in\operatorname{Spec}(R):f(\mathfrak{p})\neq 0\},$$

which is now evidently analogous to the definition of a principal open subset of an affine variety $V$: $D_{V,f}=\{x\in V: f(x)\neq 0\}.$ The ring of regular functions on $D_{V,f}$ is $k[V]_f,$ the localization of $k[V]$ at $\{1,f,f^2,f^3,\ldots\} .$ By analogy, elements of the form $a/f^n\ (a\in R)$ in $R_f$ can be regarded as allowed "functions" on $D_f,$ motivating the assignment $\mathcal{O}_X(D_f) = R_f$ as the starting point for the abstract definition of the structure sheaf of affine schemes given in the previous subsection.

The values of $f(\mathfrak{p})$ could be in different fields $\operatorname{Frac}(R/\mathfrak{p})$ that vary depending on point $\mathfrak{p}.$ Moreover, a nonzero $f\in R$ could have a value of zero at every $\mathfrak{p}\in X;$ more generally, $f$ is not determined by its values. Thus, $f\in R$ (and more generally, sections $s\in\mathcal{O}_X(U)$) cannot be interpreted as true "functions", except in special cases. Instead, elements of $\mathcal O_X(U)$ can be defined as certain allowable collections of objects, behaving like "slivers of functions", that capture the section's local behavior around each point. Specifically, a section of $\mathcal{O}_X(U)$ will be a collection of locally compatible germs, consisting of a germ $s_{\mathfrak{p}}\in R_\mathfrak{p}$ for each $\mathfrak{p}\in U$. Here, locally compatible means that, around each $\mathfrak{p}\in U,$ the germs of a section $s\in\mathcal{O}_X(U)$ coincide with all the germs of some local section $t_{\alpha}\in R_{f_{\alpha}}$ over a principal open subset $D_{f_{\alpha}}$ contained in $U$ and containing $\mathfrak{p}.$ To construct a section $(s_\mathfrak{p})_{\mathfrak{p}\in U},$ principal open subsets $\{D_{f_{\alpha}}\}$ and local sections $\{t_\alpha\}$ are chosen so that the $D_{f_{\alpha}}$ cover $U$ and the $t_\alpha$ induce a single consistent choice for the germ $s_\mathfrak{p}$ at each $\mathfrak{p}\in U.$ Formally, put

$$\begin{align}
\mathcal{O}_X(U) = \Big\{s=(s_\mathfrak{p})_{\mathfrak{p}\in U}\in\prod_{\mathfrak{p}\in U}R_{\mathfrak{p}}\ \ \ \Big|
\ &\forall \mathfrak{p}\in U,\ \exists \big((D_{f_{\alpha}}\!\ni\mathfrak{p})
\subseteq U\ \;\mathrm{and}\  \;t_\alpha\!\in R_{f_{\alpha}}\big)\\
&\mathrm{s.t.}\ \ \forall \mathfrak{q}\in D_{f_{\alpha}},\ s_\mathfrak{q}=(t_{\alpha})_\mathfrak{q}\Big\},
\end{align}$$

where $(t_{\alpha})_\mathfrak{q}\in R_{\mathfrak{q}}$ is the image of $t_{\alpha}$ under the natural map $R_{f_{\alpha}}\to R_{\mathfrak{q}}.$ It can be shown that this definition gives $\mathcal{O}_X(D_f)\cong R_f ,$ in agreement with the earlier construction. If $U'\subseteq U,$ the canonical homomorphism $\mathcal{O}_X(U)\to\mathcal{O}_X(U')$ is simply given by $s\mapsto s|_{U'}$ where $(s|_{U'})_{\mathfrak{p}}=s_{\mathfrak{p}}$ for all $\mathfrak{p}\in U'.$

The value $s(\mathfrak{p})$ is defined to be the image of $s_\mathfrak{p}$ under the natural map $R_{\mathfrak{p}}\to R_{\mathfrak{p}}/\mathfrak{m}_\mathfrak{p},$ where $\mathfrak{m}_{\mathfrak{p}} = \mathfrak{p}R_\mathfrak{p}$ is the maximal ideal of the local ring $R_\mathfrak{p}.$

If $R$ is an integral domain, with field of fractions $K=\operatorname{Frac}(R),$ then we can describe the ring $\mathcal O_X(U)$ more concretely as follows. We say that an element $f$ in $K$ is regular at a point $\mathfrak{p}$ in $X=\operatorname{Spec}{R}$ if it can be represented as a fraction $f=a/b$ with $b\notin\mathfrak{p}.$ Note that this agrees with the notion of a regular function in algebraic geometry. Using this definition, we can describe $\mathcal O_X(U)$ as precisely the set of elements of $K$ that are regular at every point $\mathfrak{p}$ in $U,$ or, more explicitly,

$$\mathcal{O}_X(U)=\{a/b\in K: \forall \mathfrak{p}\in U,\ b\notin \mathfrak{p}\}.$$

This is equivalent to describing $\mathcal O_X(U)$ as the intersection of local rings $\bigcap_{\mathfrak{p}\in U} R_\mathfrak{p}$ with each local ring $R_\mathfrak{p}$ embedded in $K$.

=== Category equivalence between rings and affine schemes ===
Affine schemes form a category whose morphisms are morphisms of ringed spaces. In this context, $\operatorname{Spec}$ is a contravariant functor from the category of commutative rings to that of affine schemes. Conversely, given an affine scheme, the defining ring may be recovered as $\mathcal O_X(X)$. This defines a functor in the opposite direction, and these two functors make the two categories dually equivalent.

==== Morphisms of affine schemes ====
A morphism of ringed spaces from $f:(X, \mathcal O_X) \to (Y, \mathcal O_Y)$ is formed by a continuous map $f$ from $X$ to $Y$, and, for every open subset $V$ of $Y$, a ring homomorphism $\mathcal O_Y(V) \to \mathcal O_X(f^{-1}(U))$; moreover, these homomorphisms must commute with the homomorphisms defined by inclusions of open sets.

For making $\operatorname{Spec}$ a functor, one must define it on ring homomorphisms.

So, let $f:R\to S$ be a homomorphism of commutative rings and denote respectively by $X=\operatorname{Spec}(R)$ and $Y=\operatorname{Spec}(S)$ the associated topological spaces. Since the points of these spaces are prime ideals, one may define a map $f^*:Y\to X$ by $f^*(\mathfrak q) = f^{-1}(\mathfrak q)$ for every prime ideal $\mathfrak q$ of $S$, since the inverse image of a prime ideal by a ring homomorphism is always a prime ideal. This map is continuous: for proving this one must prove that the inverse image of a closed subset $V(I)$ of $X$ (where $I$ is any ideal of $R$) is the closed set $V(f(I))$ (this results immediately from the monotonicity of functions relative to set inclusion). An important consequence of this fact is that $\operatorname{Spec}(R_t)$ is homeomorphic to the principal open set $D_t$; this is another motivation for defining $\mathcal{O}_X(D_t)$ to be $R_t$.

To have a morphism of ringed spaces, one must define for each open subset $U$ of $X$ a ring homomorphism $\mathcal O_X(U)\to \mathcal O_Y(f^{*-1}(U))$. In fact, it suffices to define this homomorphism on principal open sets, when $U=D_t$. In this case, this homomorphism is the canonical ring homomorphism $R_t \to S_{f(t)}$. It is straightforward, although rather lengthy, to verify all the compatibility conditions required for a morphism of ringed spaces.

=== Affine algebraic varieties ===
Affine algebraic varieties give foundational examples of affine schemes in the sense that Alexandre Grothendieck introduced scheme theory to provide a setting to clearly and precisely reformulate and resolve problems that were badly or inelegantly handled by the classical theory of varieties. Some of the issues that were addressed include dealing with multiplicities, developing a coordinate-free approach, studying the rational points over a field that is not algebraically closed, and establishing a single framework for affine, projective and abstract algebraic varieties.

An affine algebraic set $V$ over the field of complex numbers $\C$ is the set of the common zeros in $\C^n$ of a set of polynomials in $n$ indeterminates, that is, polynomials in $\C[x_1, \ldots, x_n]$. (Note: Everything what is said here remains valid if $\C$ is replaced with any other algebraically closed field.) The set of the common zeros remains the same if the polynomials are replaced with the ideal $I$ they generate. The quotient ring $R=\C[x_1, \ldots, x_n]/I$, called the ring of regular functions on $V$, is isomorphic to the ring of the polynomial functions with values in $\C$, defined up to equality on $\C$. Indeed, Hilbert's Nullstellensatz establishes a homeomorphism for Zariski topologies between the points of $V$ and the maximal ideals of $R$, that is, the closed points of $\operatorname{Spec}(R)$. So, the points of $V$ may be identified with the maximal ideals of $R$, and a regular function consists of the evaluation of an element of $R$ on the closed points of the spectrum.

In short, every statement about affine algebraic sets and affine algebraic varieties may be translated in the language of affine schemes. This has many advantages; in particular:

- There is no need to suppose the base field is algebraically closed, and even to suppose the existence of a ground field (when dealing with $\operatorname{Spec}(R)$, there is no need to suppose that $R$ contains a field.
- There is no need to suppose that $R$ is an integral domain, as it usually the case in classical algebraic geometry. In particular, the intersection of two affine varieties is, in general, not a variety; it is an algebraic set with multiplicities. For example, the intersection of the circle $x^2+y^2-1=0$ and the line $x=1$ is $\operatorname{Spec}([x,y]/\langle y^2\rangle)$, and the intersection is encoded in the affine scheme, while it is not in the set-theoretical definition of algebraic sets.

== Motivation from algebraic geometry ==
Following on from the example, in algebraic geometry one studies algebraic sets, i.e. subsets of $K^n$ (where $K$ is an algebraically closed field) that are defined as the common zeros of a set of polynomials in $n$ variables. If $A$ is such an algebraic set, one considers the commutative ring $R$ of all polynomial functions $A\to K$. The maximal ideals of $R$ correspond to the points of $A$ (because $K$ is algebraically closed), and the prime ideals of $R$ correspond to the irreducible subvarieties of $A$ (an algebraic set is called irreducible if it cannot be written as the union of two proper algebraic subsets).

The spectrum of $R$ therefore consists of the points of $A$ together with elements for all irreducible subvarieties of $A$. The points of $A$ are closed in the spectrum, while the elements corresponding to subvarieties have a closure consisting of all their points and subvarieties. If one only considers the points of $A$, i.e. the maximal ideals in $R$, then the Zariski topology defined above coincides with the Zariski topology defined on algebraic sets (which has precisely the algebraic subsets as closed sets). Specifically, the maximal ideals in $R$, i.e. $\operatorname{MaxSpec}(R)$, together with the Zariski topology, is homeomorphic to $A$ also with the Zariski topology.

One can thus view the topological space $\operatorname{Spec}(R)$ as an "enrichment" of the topological space $A$ (with Zariski topology): for every irreducible subvariety of $A$, one additional non-closed point has been introduced, and this point "keeps track" of the corresponding irreducible subvariety. One thinks of this point as the generic point for the irreducible subvariety. Furthermore, the structure sheaf on $\operatorname{Spec}(R)$ and the sheaf of polynomial functions on $A$ are essentially identical. By studying spectra of polynomial rings instead of algebraic sets with the Zariski topology, one can generalize the concepts of algebraic geometry to non-algebraically closed fields and beyond, eventually arriving at the language of schemes.

== Examples ==
- The spectrum of integers: The affine scheme $\operatorname{Spec}(\mathbb{Z})$ is the final object in the category of affine schemes since $\mathbb{Z}$ is the initial object in the category of commutative rings. As a set, $\operatorname{Spec}(\mathbb{Z})$ consists of the points $(0)$ and $(p)$ for prime numbers $p$. The open sets of $\operatorname{Spec}(\mathbb{Z})$ are $\emptyset$ and subsets of the form $U=\operatorname{Spec}(\mathbb{Z})\setminus\{(p_1),\dots,(p_n)\}$ for a finite number of prime numbers $p_1,\dots,p_n.$ The sections of $\mathcal{O}_{\operatorname{Spec}(\mathbb{Z})}(U)$ are the rational numbers $a/b\in\mathbb{Q}$ where $b=p_1^{e_1}\cdots p_n^{e_n}$ for non-negative integer exponents $e_1,\dots,e_n.$ The stalks at $(p)$ are the local rings $\mathbb{Z}_{(p)};$ the stalk at $(0)$ is $\mathbb{Q}.$
- The spectrum of polynomials over $\mathbb{Z}:$ The affine scheme $\operatorname{Spec}(\mathbb{Z}[x])$ consists of four types of points: 1) the zero ideal $(0);$ 2) the principal ideals $(p)$ generated by prime numbers $p;$ 3) the principal ideals $(f)$ generated by irreducible polynomials $f;$ and 4) the maximal ideals $(p,f)$ generated by prime numbers $p$ and polynomials $f$ whose reduction mod $p$ in $\mathbb{F}_p[x]$ is irreducible. Some topological and geometric features of $\operatorname{Spec}(\mathbb{Z}[x])$ have been illustrated in a famous sketch by David Mumford, now known as 'Mumford's treasure map', found in his introductory textbook The Red Book of Varieties and Schemes.
- The scheme-theoretic analogue of $\mathbb{C}^n$: The affine scheme $\mathbb{A}^n_\mathbb{C} = \operatorname{Spec}(\mathbb{C}[x_1,\ldots, x_n])$. From the functor of points perspective, a point $(\alpha_1,\ldots,\alpha_n) \in \mathbb{C}^n$ can be identified with the evaluation morphism $\mathbb{C}[x_1,\ldots, x_n]\xrightarrow[ev_{(\alpha_1,\dots,\alpha_n)}]{} \mathbb{C}$. This fundamental observation allows us to give meaning to other affine schemes.
- The cross: $\operatorname{Spec}(\mathbb{C}[x,y]/(xy))$ looks topologically like the transverse intersection of two complex planes at a point (in particular, this scheme is not irreducible), although typically this is depicted as a $+$, since the only well defined morphisms to $\mathbb{C}$ are the evaluation morphisms associated with the points $\{(\alpha_1,0), (0,\alpha_2) : \alpha_1,\alpha_2 \in \mathbb{C} \}$.
- The prime spectrum of a Boolean ring (e.g., a power set ring) is a compact totally disconnected Hausdorff space (that is, a Stone space).
- (M. Hochster) A topological space is homeomorphic to the prime spectrum of a commutative ring (i.e., a spectral space) if and only if it is compact, quasi-separated and sober.

== Non-affine examples ==
Here are some examples of schemes that are not affine schemes. They are constructed from gluing affine schemes together.

- The projective $n$-space $\mathbb{P}^n_k = \operatorname{Proj}k[x_0,\ldots, x_n]$ over a field $k$. This can be easily generalized to any base ring, see Proj construction (in fact, we can define projective space for any base scheme). The projective $n$-space for $n \geq 1$ is not affine as the ring of global sections of $\mathbb{P}^n_k$ is $k$.
- Affine plane minus the origin. Inside $\mathbb{A}^2_k = \operatorname{Spec} k[x,y]$ are distinguished open affine subschemes $D_x , D_y$. Their union $D_x \cup D_y = U$ is the affine plane with the origin taken out. The global sections of $U$ are pairs of polynomials on $D_x,D_y$ that restrict to the same polynomial on $D_{xy}$, which can be shown to be $k[x,y]$, the global sections of $\mathbb{A}^2_k$. $U$ is not affine as $V_{(x)} \cap V_{(y)} = \varnothing$ in $U$.

== Non-Zariski topologies on a prime spectrum ==
Some authors (notably M. Hochster) consider topologies on prime spectra other than the Zariski topology.

First, there is the notion of constructible topology: given a ring A, the subsets of $\operatorname{Spec}(A)$ of the form $\varphi^*(\operatorname{Spec} B), \varphi: A \to B$ satisfy the axioms for closed sets in a topological space. This topology on $\operatorname{Spec}(A)$ is called the constructible topology.

In Hochster (1969), Hochster considers what he calls the patch topology on a prime spectrum. By definition, the patch topology is the smallest topology in which the sets of the forms $V(I)$ and $\operatorname{Spec}(A) - V(f)$ are closed.

== Global or relative Spec ==
There is a relative version of the functor $\operatorname{Spec}$ called global $\operatorname{Spec}$, or relative $\operatorname{Spec}$. If $S$ is a scheme, then relative $\operatorname{Spec}$ is denoted by $\underline{\operatorname{Spec}}_S$ or $\mathbf{Spec}_S$. If $S$ is clear from the context, then relative Spec may be denoted by $\underline{\operatorname{Spec}}$ or $\mathbf{Spec}$. For a scheme $S$ and a quasi-coherent sheaf of $\mathcal{O}_S$-algebras $\mathcal{A}$, there is a scheme $\underline{\operatorname{Spec}}_S(\mathcal{A})$ and a morphism $f : \underline{\operatorname{Spec}}_S(\mathcal{A}) \to S$ such that for every open affine $U \subseteq S$, there is an isomorphism $f^{-1}(U) \cong \operatorname{Spec}(\mathcal{A}(U))$, and such that for open affines $V \subseteq U$, the inclusion $f^{-1}(V) \to f^{-1}(U)$ is induced by the restriction map $\mathcal{A}(U) \to \mathcal{A}(V)$. That is, as ring homomorphisms induce opposite maps of spectra, the restriction maps of a sheaf of algebras induce the inclusion maps of the spectra that make up the Spec of the sheaf.

Global Spec has a universal property similar to the universal property for ordinary Spec. More precisely, just as Spec and the global section functor are contravariant right adjoints between the category of commutative rings and schemes, global Spec and the direct image functor for the structure map are contravariant right adjoints between the category of commutative $\mathcal{O}_S$-algebras and schemes over $S$. In formulas,

$$\operatorname{Hom}_{\mathcal{O}_S\text{-alg}}(\mathcal{A}, \pi_*\mathcal{O}_X) \cong \operatorname{Hom}_{\text{Sch}/S}(X, \mathbf{Spec}(\mathcal{A})),$$

where $\pi \colon X \to S$ is a morphism of schemes.

=== Example of a relative Spec ===
The relative spec is the correct tool for parameterizing the family of lines through the origin of $\mathbb{A}^2_\mathbb{C}$ over $X = \mathbb{P}^1_{a,b}.$ Consider the sheaf of algebras $\mathcal{A} = \mathcal{O}_X[x,y],$ and let $\mathcal{I} = (ay-bx)$ be a sheaf of ideals of $\mathcal{A}.$ Then the relative spec $\underline{\operatorname{Spec}}_X(\mathcal{A}/\mathcal{I}) \to \mathbb{P}^1_{a,b}$ parameterizes the desired family. In fact, the fiber over $[\alpha:\beta]$ is the line through the origin of $\mathbb{A}^2$ containing the point $(\alpha,\beta).$ Assuming $\alpha \neq 0,$ the fiber can be computed by looking at the composition of pullback diagrams

$$\begin{matrix}
\operatorname{Spec}\left( \frac{\mathbb{C}[x,y]}{\left(y-\frac{\beta}{\alpha}x\right)} \right) & \to & \operatorname{Spec}\left( \frac{\mathbb{C}\left[\frac{b}{a}\right] [x,y]}{\left(y-\frac{b}{a}x\right)} \right) & \to & \underline{\operatorname{Spec}}_X\left( \frac{\mathcal{O}_X[x,y]}{\left(ay-bx\right)} \right)\\
\downarrow & & \downarrow & &  \downarrow \\
\operatorname{Spec}(\mathbb{C})& \to & \operatorname{Spec}\left(\mathbb{C}\left[\frac{b}{a}\right]\right)=U_a & \to &  \mathbb{P}^1_{a,b}
\end{matrix}$$

where the composition of the bottom arrows

$$\operatorname{Spec}(\mathbb{C})\xrightarrow{[\alpha:\beta]} \mathbb{P}^1_{a,b}$$

gives the line containing the point $(\alpha,\beta)$ and the origin. This example can be generalized to parameterize the family of lines through the origin of $\mathbb{A}^{n+1}_\mathbb{C}$ over $X = \mathbb{P}^n_{a_0,...,a_n}$ by letting $\mathcal{A} = \mathcal{O}_X[x_0,...,x_n]$ and
$$\mathcal{I} = \left( 2\times 2 \text{ minors of } \begin{pmatrix}a_0 & \cdots & a_n \\
x_0 & \cdots & x_n\end{pmatrix} \right).$$

== Representation theory perspective ==
From the perspective of representation theory, a prime ideal I corresponds to a module R/I, and the spectrum of a ring corresponds to irreducible cyclic representations of R, while more general subvarieties correspond to possibly reducible representations that need not be cyclic. Recall that abstractly, the representation theory of a group is the study of modules over its group algebra.

The connection to representation theory is clearer if one considers the polynomial ring $R=K[x_1,\dots,x_n]$ or, without a basis, $R=K[V].$ As the latter formulation makes clear, a polynomial ring is the monoid algebra over a vector space, and writing in terms of $x_i$ corresponds to choosing a basis for the vector space. Then an ideal I, or equivalently a module $R/I,$ is a cyclic representation of R (cyclic meaning generated by 1 element as an R-module; this generalizes 1-dimensional representations).

In the case that the field is algebraically closed (say, the complex numbers), every maximal ideal corresponds to a point in n-space, by the Nullstellensatz (the maximal ideal generated by $(x_1-a_1), (x_2-a_2),\ldots,(x_n-a_n)$ corresponds to the point $(a_1,\ldots,a_n)$). These representations of $K[V]$ are then parametrized by the dual space $V^*,$ the covector being given by sending each $x_i$ to the corresponding $a_i$. Thus a representation of $K^n$ (K-linear maps $K^n \to K$) is given by a set of n numbers, or equivalently a covector $K^n \to K.$

Thus, points in n-space, thought of as the max spec of $R=K[x_1,\dots,x_n],$ correspond precisely to 1-dimensional representations of R, while finite sets of points correspond to finite-dimensional representations (which are reducible, corresponding geometrically to being a union, and algebraically to not being a prime ideal). The non-maximal ideals then correspond to infinite-dimensional representations.

== Functional analysis perspective ==
The term "spectrum" comes from the use in operator theory. Given a linear operator T on a finite-dimensional vector space V, one can consider the vector space with operator as a module over the polynomial ring in one variable R = K[T], as in the structure theorem for finitely generated modules over a principal ideal domain. Then the spectrum of K[T] (as a ring) equals the spectrum of T (as an operator).

Further, the geometric structure of the spectrum of the ring (equivalently, the algebraic structure of the module) captures the behavior of the spectrum of the operator, such as algebraic multiplicity and geometric multiplicity. For instance, for the 2×2 identity matrix has corresponding module:

$$K[T]/(T-1) \oplus K[T]/(T-1)$$

the 2×2 zero matrix has module

$$K[T]/(T-0) \oplus K[T]/(T-0),$$

showing geometric multiplicity 2 for the zero eigenvalue, while a non-trivial 2×2 nilpotent matrix has module

$$K[T]/T^2,$$

showing algebraic multiplicity 2 but geometric multiplicity 1.

In more detail:

- the eigenvalues (with geometric multiplicity) of the operator correspond to the (reduced) points of the variety, with multiplicity;
- the primary decomposition of the module corresponds to the unreduced points of the variety;
- a diagonalizable (semisimple) operator corresponds to a reduced variety;
- a cyclic module (one generator) corresponds to the operator having a cyclic vector (a vector whose orbit under T spans the space);
- the last invariant factor of the module equals the minimal polynomial of the operator, and the product of the invariant factors equals the characteristic polynomial.

== Similar concepts ==
The spectrum can also be considered for C*-algebras in operator theory, yielding the notion of the spectrum of a C*-algebra. Notably, for a compact Hausdorff space $X$, the ring of continuous (complex-valued) functions $C(X)$ is a unital commutative C*-algebra, with the space being recovered as a topological space from $\operatorname{MaxSpec} C(X)$, indeed functorially so; this is the content of the Banach–Stone theorem. Indeed, any unital commutative C*-algebra can be realized as the ring of continuous functions of a compact Hausdorff space in this way, yielding the same correspondence as between a ring and its spectrum. Generalizing to non-commutative C*-algebras yields noncommutative topology.

== See also ==
- Scheme (mathematics)
- Projective scheme
- Spectrum of a matrix
- Serre's theorem on affineness
- Étale spectrum
- Ziegler spectrum
- Primitive spectrum
- Stone duality
