= Zariski's lemma =

Theorem in algebra

In algebra, Zariski's lemma, proved by Oscar Zariski (1947), states that, if a field K is finitely generated as an associative algebra over another field k, then K is a finite field extension of k; that is, K is finitely generated as a module (in other words, K is a finite dimensional vector space) over k.

An important application of the lemma is a proof of the weak form of Hilbert's Nullstellensatz: if I is a proper ideal of $k[t_1, ..., t_n]$ (k an algebraically closed field), then I has a zero; i.e., there is a point x in $k^n$ such that $f(x) = 0$ for all f in I. (Proof: replacing I by a maximal ideal $\mathfrak{m}$, we can assume $I = \mathfrak{m}$ is maximal. Let $A = k[t_1, ..., t_n]$ and $\phi: A \to A / \mathfrak{m}$ be the natural surjection. By the lemma $A / \mathfrak{m}$ is a finite extension. Since k is algebraically closed that extension must be k. Then for any $f \in \mathfrak{m}$,

$$f(\phi(t_1), \cdots, \phi(t_n)) = \phi(f(t_1, \cdots, t_n)) = 0$$;

that is to say, $x = (\phi(t_1), \cdots, \phi(t_n))$ is a zero of $\mathfrak{m}$.)

The lemma may also be understood from the following perspective. In general, a ring R is a Jacobson ring if and only if every finitely generated R-algebra that is a field is finite over R. Thus, the lemma follows from the fact that a field is a Jacobson ring.

== Proofs ==
Two direct proofs are given in Atiyah–MacDonald; the one is due to Zariski and the other uses the Artin–Tate lemma. For Zariski's original proof, see the original paper. Another direct proof in the language of Jacobson rings is given below. The lemma is also a consequence of the Noether normalization lemma. Indeed, by the normalization lemma, K is a finite module over the polynomial ring $k[x_1, \ldots , x_d]$ where $x_1, \ldots , x_d$ are elements of K that are algebraically independent over k. But since K has Krull dimension zero and since an integral ring extension (e.g., a finite ring extension) preserves Krull dimensions, the polynomial ring must have dimension zero; i.e., $d=0$.

The following characterization of a Jacobson ring contains Zariski's lemma as a special case. Recall that a ring is a Jacobson ring if every prime ideal is an intersection of maximal ideals. (When A is a field, A is a Jacobson ring and the theorem below is precisely Zariski's lemma.)

Theorem— Let A be a ring. Then the following are equivalent.

1. A is a Jacobson ring.
2. Every finitely generated A-algebra B that is a field is finite over A.

Proof: 2. $\Rightarrow$ 1.: Let $\mathfrak{p}$ be a prime ideal of A and set $B = A/\mathfrak{p}$. We need to show the Jacobson radical of B is zero. For that end, let f be a nonzero element of B. Let $\mathfrak{m}$ be a maximal ideal of the localization $B[f^{-1}]$. Then $B[f^{-1}]/\mathfrak{m}$ is a field that is a finitely generated A-algebra and so is finite over A by assumption; thus it is finite over $B = A/\mathfrak{p}$ and so is finite over the subring $B/\mathfrak{q}$ where $\mathfrak{q} = \mathfrak{m} \cap B$. By integrality, $\mathfrak{q}$ is a maximal ideal not containing f.

1. $\Rightarrow$ 2.: Since a factor ring of a Jacobson ring is Jacobson, we can assume B contains A as a subring. Then the assertion is a consequence of the next algebraic fact:

(*) Let $B \supseteq A$ be integral domains such that B is finitely generated as A-algebra. Then there exists a nonzero a in A such that every ring homomorphism $\phi: A \to K$, K an algebraically closed field, with $\phi(a) \ne 0$ extends to $\widetilde{\phi}: B \to K$.

Indeed, choose a maximal ideal $\mathfrak{m}$ of A not containing a. Writing K for some algebraic closure of $A/\mathfrak{m}$, the canonical map $\phi: A \to A/\mathfrak{m} \hookrightarrow K$ extends to $\widetilde{\phi}: B \to K$. Since B is a field, $\widetilde{\phi}$ is injective and so B is algebraic (thus finite algebraic) over $A/\mathfrak{m}$. We now prove (*). If B contains an element that is transcendental over A, then it contains a polynomial ring over A to which φ extends (without a requirement on a) and so we can assume B is algebraic over A (by Zorn's lemma, say). Let $x_1, \dots, x_r$ be the generators of B as A-algebra. Then each $x_i$ satisfies the relation

$$a_{i0}x_i^n + a_{i1}x_i^{n-1} + \dots + a_{in} = 0, \, \, a_{ij} \in A$$

where n depends on i and $a_{i0} \ne 0$. Set $a = a_{10}a_{20} \dots a_{r0}$. Then $B[a^{-1}]$ is integral over $A[a^{-1}]$. Now given $\phi: A \to K$, we first extend it to $\widetilde{\phi}: A[a^{-1}] \to K$ by setting $\widetilde{\phi}(a^{-1}) = \phi(a)^{-1}$. Next, let $\mathfrak{m} = \operatorname{ker}\widetilde{\phi}$. By integrality, $\mathfrak{m} = \mathfrak{n} \cap A[a^{-1}]$ for some maximal ideal $\mathfrak{n}$ of $B[a^{-1}]$. Then $\widetilde{\phi}: A[a^{-1}] \to A[a^{-1}]/\mathfrak{m} \to K$ extends to $B[a^{-1}] \to B[a^{-1}]/\mathfrak{n} \to K$. Restrict the last map to B to finish the proof. $\square$
