= Rabinowitsch trick =

Mathematical proof of Hilbert's Nullstellensatz

In mathematics, the Rabinowitsch trick, introduced by J. L. Rabinowitsch (1929), is a short way of proving the general case of the Hilbert Nullstellensatz from an easier special case (the so-called weak Nullstellensatz), by introducing an extra variable.

The Rabinowitsch trick goes as follows. Let $K$ be an algebraically closed field. Suppose the polynomial $f$ in $K[x_1, \dots, x_n]$ vanishes whenever all polynomials $f_1, \dots, f_m$ vanish. Then the polynomials $f_1, \dots, f_m, 1 - x_0 f$ have no common zeros (where we have introduced a new variable $x_0$), so by the weak Nullstellensatz for $K[x_0, \dots, x_n]$ they generate the unit ideal of $K[x_0, \dots, x_n]$. Spelt out, this means there are polynomials $g_0,g_1,\dots,g_m \in K[x_0,x_1,\dots,x_n]$ such that

$$1 = g_0(x_0,x_1,\dots,x_n) (1 - x_0 f(x_1,\dots,x_n)) + \sum_{i=1}^m g_i(x_0,x_1,\dots,x_n) f_i(x_1,\dots,x_n)$$

as an equality of elements of the polynomial ring $K[x_0,x_1,\dots,x_n]$. Since $x_0,x_1,\dots,x_n$ are free variables, this equality continues to hold if expressions are substituted for some of the variables; in particular, it follows from substituting $x_0 = 1/f(x_1,\dots,x_n)$ that

$$1 = \sum_{i=1}^m g_i(1/f(x_1,\dots,x_n),x_1,\dots,x_n) f_i(x_1,\dots,x_n)$$

as elements of the field of rational functions $K(x_1,\dots,x_n)$, the field of fractions of the polynomial ring $K[x_1,\dots,x_n]$. Moreover, the only expressions that occur in the denominators of the right hand side are $f$ and powers of $f$, so rewriting that right hand side to have a common denominator results in an equality on the form

$$1 = \frac{ \sum_{i=1}^m h_i(x_1,\dots,x_n) f_i(x_1,\dots,x_n) }{f(x_1,\dots,x_n)^r}$$

for some natural number $r$ and polynomials $h_1,\dots,h_m \in K[x_1,\dots,x_n]$. Hence

$$f(x_1,\dots,x_n)^r = \sum_{i=1}^m h_i(x_1,\dots,x_n) f_i(x_1,\dots,x_n),$$

which states exactly that $f^r$ lies in the ideal generated by $f_1, \dots, f_m$. This is the full version of the Nullstellensatz for $K[x_1, \dots, x_n]$.
