= Rainville polynomials =

In mathematics, the Rainville polynomials p_{n}(z) are polynomials introduced by Rainville (1945) given by the generating function

$$\displaystyle e^wI_0(zw) = \sum_np_n(z)w^n$$
