= Constructible topology =

In commutative algebra, the constructible topology on the spectrum $\operatorname{Spec}(A)$ of a commutative ring $A$ is a topology where each closed set is the image of $\operatorname{Spec} (B)$ in $\operatorname{Spec}(A)$ for some algebra B over A. An important feature of this construction is that the map $\operatorname{Spec}(B) \to \operatorname{Spec}(A)$ is a closed map with respect to the constructible topology.

With respect to this topology, $\operatorname{Spec}(A)$ is a compact, Hausdorff, and totally disconnected topological space (i.e., a Stone space). In general, the constructible topology is a finer topology than the Zariski topology, and the two topologies coincide if and only if $A / \operatorname{nil}(A)$ is a von Neumann regular ring, where $\operatorname{nil}(A)$ is the nilradical of A.

Despite the terminology being similar, the constructible topology is not the same as the set of all constructible sets.

== See also ==
- Constructible set (topology)
