= Ziegler spectrum =

In mathematics, the (right) Ziegler spectrum of a ring R is a topological space whose points are (isomorphism classes of) indecomposable pure-injective right R-modules. Its closed subsets correspond to theories of modules closed under arbitrary products and direct summands. Ziegler spectra are named after Martin Ziegler, who first defined and studied them in 1984.

== Definition ==
Let R be a ring (associative, with 1, not necessarily commutative). A (right) pp-n-formula is a formula in the language of (right) R-modules of the form

$$\exists \overline{y} \ (\overline{y},\overline{x}) A=0$$

where $\ell,n,m$ are natural numbers, $A$ is an $(\ell+n)\times m$ matrix with entries from R, and $\overline{y}$ is an $\ell$-tuple of variables and $\overline{x}$ is an $n$-tuple of variables.

The (right) Ziegler spectrum, $\operatorname{Zg}_R$, of R is the topological space whose points are isomorphism classes of indecomposable pure-injective right modules, denoted by $\operatorname{pinj}_R$, and the topology has the sets

$$(\varphi/\psi) = \{N\in\operatorname{pinj}_R \mid \varphi(N) \supsetneq \psi(N)\cap\varphi(N)\}$$

as subbasis of open sets, where $\varphi,\psi$ range over (right) pp-1-formulae and $\varphi(N)$ denotes the subgroup of $N$ consisting of all elements that satisfy the one-variable formula $\varphi$. One can show that these sets form a basis.

== Properties ==
Ziegler spectra are rarely Hausdorff and often fail to have the $T_0$-property. However they are always compact and have a basis of compact open sets given by the sets $(\varphi/\psi)$ where $\varphi,\psi$ are pp-1-formulae.

When the ring R is countable $\operatorname{Zg}_R$ is sober. It is not currently known if all Ziegler spectra are sober.

== Generalization ==
Ivo Herzog showed in 1997 how to define the Ziegler spectrum of a locally coherent Grothendieck category, which generalizes the construction above.
