= Constructible set (topology) =

In topology, constructible sets are a class of subsets of a topological space that have a relatively "simple" structure. They are used particularly in algebraic geometry and related fields. A key result known as Chevalley's theorem in algebraic geometry shows that the image of a constructible set is constructible for an important class of mappings (more specifically morphisms) of algebraic varieties (or more generally schemes). In addition, a large number of "local" geometric properties of schemes, morphisms and sheaves are (locally) constructible. Constructible sets also feature in the definition of various types of constructible sheaves in algebraic geometry and intersection cohomology.

== Definitions ==
A simple definition, adequate in many situations, is that a constructible set is a finite union of locally closed sets. (A set is locally closed if it is the intersection of an open set and closed set.) However, a modification and another slightly weaker definition are needed to have definitions that behave better with "large" spaces:

Definitions: A subset $Z$ of a topological space $X$ is called retrocompact if $Z\cap U$ is compact for every compact open subset $U\subset X$. A subset of $X$ is constructible if it is a finite union of subsets of the form $U\cap (X - V)$ where both $U$ and $V$ are open and retrocompact subsets of $X$. A subset $Z\subset X$ is locally constructible if there is a cover $(U_i)_{i\in I}$ of $X$ consisting of open subsets with the property that each $Z\cap U_i$ is a constructible subset of $U_i$.

Equivalently the constructible subsets of a topological space $X$ are the smallest collection $\mathfrak{C}$ of subsets of $X$ that (i) contains all open retrocompact subsets and (ii) contains all complements and finite unions (and hence also finite intersections) of sets in it. In other words, constructible sets are precisely the Boolean algebra generated by retrocompact open subsets.

In a locally noetherian topological space, all subsets are retrocompact, and so for such spaces the simplified definition given first above is equivalent to the more elaborate one. Most of the commonly met schemes in algebraic geometry (including all algebraic varieties) are locally Noetherian, but there are important constructions that lead to more general schemes.

In any (not necessarily noetherian) topological space, every constructible set contains a dense open subset of its closure.

Terminology: The definition given here is the one used by the first edition of EGA and the Stacks Project. In the second edition of EGA constructible sets (according to the definition above) are called "globally constructible" while the word "constructible" is reserved for what are called locally constructible above.

== Chevalley's theorem ==
A major reason for the importance of constructible sets in algebraic geometry is that the image of a (locally) constructible set is also (locally) constructible for a large class of maps (or "morphisms"). The key result is:

Chevalley's theorem. If $f: X \to Y$ is a finitely presented morphism of schemes and $Z\subset X$ is a locally constructible subset, then $f(Z)$ is also locally constructible in $Y$.

In particular, the image of an algebraic variety need not be a variety, but is (under the assumptions) always a constructible set. For example, the map $\mathbf A^2 \rightarrow \mathbf A^2$ that sends $(x,y)$ to $(x,xy)$ has image the set $\{ x \neq 0 \} \cup \{ x=y=0 \}$, which is not a variety, but is constructible.

Chevalley's theorem in the generality stated above would fail if the simplified definition of constructible sets (without restricting to retrocompact open sets in the definition) were used.

== Constructible properties ==
A large number of "local" properties of morphisms of schemes and quasicoherent sheaves on schemes hold true over a locally constructible subset. EGA IV § 9 covers a large number of such properties. Below are some examples (where all references point to EGA IV):

- If $f \colon X \rightarrow S$ is a finitely presented morphism of schemes and $\mathcal{F}'\rightarrow\mathcal{F}\rightarrow\mathcal{F}''$ is a sequence of finitely presented quasi-coherent $\mathcal{O}_X$-modules, then the set of $s\in S$ for which $\mathcal{F}'_s\rightarrow\mathcal{F}_s\rightarrow\mathcal{F}''_s$ is exact is locally constructible. (Proposition (9.4.4))
- If $f \colon X \rightarrow S$ is an finitely presented morphism of schemes and $\mathcal{F}$ is a finitely presented quasi-coherent $\mathcal{O}_X$-module, then the set of $s\in S$ for which $\mathcal{F}_s$ is locally free is locally constructible. (Proposition (9.4.7))
- If $f \colon X \rightarrow S$ is an finitely presented morphism of schemes and $Z\subset X$ is a locally constructible subset, then the set of $s\in S$ for which $f^{-1}(s)\cap Z$ is closed (or open) in $f^{-1}(s)$ is locally constructible. (Corollary (9.5.4))
- Let $S$ be a scheme and $f \colon X \rightarrow Y$ a morphism of $S$-schemes. Consider the set $P\subset S$ of $s\in S$ for which the induced morphism $f_s\colon X_s\rightarrow Y_s$ of fibres over $s$ has some property $\mathbf{P}$. Then $P$ is locally constructible if $\mathbf{P}$ is any of the following properties: surjective, proper, finite, immersion, closed immersion, open immersion, isomorphism. (Proposition (9.6.1))
- Let $f \colon X \rightarrow S$ be an finitely presented morphism of schemes and consider the set $P\subset S$ of $s\in S$ for which the fibre $f^{-1}(s)$ has a property $\mathbf{P}$. Then $P$ is locally constructible if $\mathbf{P}$ is any of the following properties: geometrically irreducible, geometrically connected, geometrically reduced. (Theorem (9.7.7))
- Let $f \colon X \rightarrow S$ be an locally finitely presented morphism of schemes and consider the set $P\subset X$ of $x\in X$ for which the fibre $f^{-1}(f(x))$ has a property $\mathbf{P}$. Then $P$ is locally constructible if $\mathbf{P}$ is any of the following properties: geometrically regular, geometrically normal, geometrically reduced. (Proposition (9.9.4))

One important role that these constructibility results have is that in most cases assuming the morphisms in questions are also flat it follows that the properties in question in fact hold in an open subset. A substantial number of such results is included in EGA IV § 12.

== See also ==
- Constructible topology
- Constructible sheaf
