= Oscar Goldman (mathematician) =

American mathematician

Oscar Goldman (1925 – 17 December 1986, Bryn Mawr) was an American mathematician, who worked on algebra and its applications to number theory.

Oscar Goldman received his Ph.D. in 1948 under Claude Chevalley at Princeton University. He was chair of the Mathematics Department at Brandeis University from 1952 to 1960. As chair of the department his immediate successor was Maurice Auslander.

In 1962, Goldman left Brandeis to become a professor and chair of the mathematics department at the University of Pennsylvania. Murray Gerstenhaber and Chung Tao Yang had persuaded Provost David R. Goddard to hire Goldman to help improve the quality of U. Penn's mathematics department to the level of the mathematics departments of the University of Chicago, Harvard University, and Princeton University. From 1963 to 1967, Goldman served as the chair of the mathematics department of U. Penn., hired several outstanding mathematicians including Richard Kadison and Eugenio Calabi, and regularly consulted Saunders Mac Lane and Donald C. Spencer in making his decisions on hiring and curriculum improvements.

Goldman was shot and wounded on February 11, 1970, at the University of Pennsylvania campus by disgruntled student Robert Cantor, who also shot and killed Professor Walter Koppelman before killing himself. Goldman ultimately recovered from his wounds.

== Publications ==
- Goldman, Oscar (1946). "A characterization of semi-simple rings with the descending chain condition". Bulletin of the American Mathematical Society. 52 (12): 1021–1027. doi:10.1090/s0002-9904-1946-08703-0. MR 0019592.
- Goldman, Oscar (1946). "Semi-simple extensions of rings". Bulletin of the American Mathematical Society. 52 (12): 1028–1032. doi:10.1090/s0002-9904-1946-08704-2. MR 0019593.
- Goldman, Oscar (1947). "Addition to my note on semi-simple rings". Bulletin of the American Mathematical Society. 53 (10): 956. doi:10.1090/s0002-9904-1947-08914-x. MR 0022836.
- with Maurice Auslander: Auslander, Maurice; Goldman, Oscar (1960). "Maximal orders". Transactions of the American Mathematical Society. 97 (1): 1–24. doi:10.1090/s0002-9947-1960-0117252-7. MR 0117252.
- with Maurice Auslander: Auslander, Maurice; Goldman, Oscar (1960). "The Brauer group of a commutative ring". Transactions of the American Mathematical Society. 97 (3): 367–409. doi:10.1090/s0002-9947-1960-0121392-6. MR 0121392.

== See also ==
- Goldman domain
