= Timeline of class field theory =

In mathematics, class field theory is the study of abelian extensions of local and global fields.

== Timeline ==
- 1801 Carl Friedrich Gauss proves the law of quadratic reciprocity
- 1829 Niels Henrik Abel uses special values of the lemniscate function to construct abelian extensions of $\mathbb{Q}(i)$.
- 1837 Dirichlet's theorem on arithmetic progressions.
- 1853 Leopold Kronecker announces the Kronecker–Weber theorem
- 1880 Kronecker introduces his Jugendtraum about abelian extensions of imaginary quadratic fields
- 1886 Heinrich Martin Weber proves the Kronecker–Weber theorem (with a slight gap).
- 1896 David Hilbert gives the first complete proof of the Kronecker–Weber theorem.
- 1897 Weber introduces ray class groups and general ideal class groups.
- 1897 Hilbert publishes his Zahlbericht.
- 1897 Hilbert rewrites the law of quadratic reciprocity as a product formula for the Hilbert symbol.
- 1897 Kurt Hensel introduced p-adic numbers.
- 1898 Hilbert conjectures the existence and properties of the (narrow) Hilbert class field, proving them in the special case of class number 2.
- 1907 Philipp Furtwängler proves existence and basic properties of the Hilbert class field.
- 1908 Weber defines the class field of a general ideal class group.
- 1920 Teiji Takagi shows that the abelian extensions of a number field are exactly the class fields of ideal class groups.
- 1922 Takagi's paper on reciprocity laws
- 1923 Helmut Hasse introduced the Hasse principle (for the special case of quadratic forms).
- 1923 Emil Artin conjectures his reciprocity law.
- 1924 Artin introduces Artin L-functions.
- 1926 Nikolai Chebotaryov proves his density theorem.
- 1927 Artin proves his reciprocity law giving a canonical isomorphism between Galois groups and ideal class groups.
- 1930 Furtwängler and Artin prove the principal ideal theorem.
- 1930 Hasse introduces local class field theory.
- 1931 Hasse proves the Hasse norm theorem.
- 1931 Hasse classifies simple algebras over local fields.
- 1931 Jacques Herbrand introduces the Herbrand quotient.
- 1931 The Albert–Brauer–Hasse–Noether theorem proves the Hasse principle for simple algebras over global fields.
- 1933 Hasse classifies simple algebras over number fields.
- 1934 Max Deuring and Emmy Noether develop class field theory using algebras.
- 1936 Claude Chevalley introduces ideles.
- 1940 Chevalley uses ideles to give an algebraic proof of the second inequality for abelian extensions.
- 1948 Shianghao Wang proves the Grunwald–Wang theorem, correcting an error of Grunwald's.
- 1950 Tate's thesis uses analysis on adele rings to study zeta functions.
- 1951 André Weil introduces Weil groups.
- 1952 Artin and Tate introduce class formations in their notes on class field theory.
- 1952 Gerhard Hochschild and Tadashi Nakayama introduce group cohomology into class field theory.
- 1952 John Tate introduces Tate cohomology groups.
- 1964 Evgeny Golod and Igor Shafarevich prove that the class field tower can be infinite.
- 1965 Jonathan Lubin and Tate use Lubin–Tate formal group laws to construct ramified abelian extensions of local fields.
