= Azumaya algebra =

Concept in ring theory

In mathematics, an Azumaya algebra is a generalization of central simple algebras to $R$-algebras where $R$ need not be a field. Such a notion was introduced in a 1951 paper of Goro Azumaya, for the case where $R$ is a commutative local ring. The notion was developed further in ring theory, and in algebraic geometry, where Alexander Grothendieck made it the basis for his geometric theory of the Brauer group in Bourbaki seminars from 1964–65. There are now several points of access to the basic definitions.

== Over a ring ==
An Azumaya algebra over a commutative ring $R$ is an $R$-algebra $A$ obeying any of the following equivalent conditions:

1. There exists an $R$-algebra $B$ such that the tensor product of $R$-algebras $B \otimes_R A$ is Morita equivalent to $R$.
2. The $R$-algebra $A^{\mathrm{op}} \otimes_R A$ is Morita equivalent to $R$, where $A^{\mathrm{op}}$ is the opposite algebra of $A$.
3. The center of $A$ is $R$, and $A$ is separable.
4. $A$ is finitely generated, faithful, and projective as an $R$-module, and the tensor product $A \otimes_R A^{\mathrm{op}}$ is isomorphic to $\text{End}_R(A)$ via the map sending $a \otimes b$ to the endomorphism $x\mapsto axb$ of $A$.

=== Examples over a field ===
Over a field $k$, Azumaya algebras are completely classified by the Artin–Wedderburn theorem since they are the same as central simple algebras. These are algebras isomorphic to the matrix ring $\mathrm{M}_n(D)$ for some division algebra $D$ over $k$ whose center is just $k$. For example, quaternion algebras provide examples of central simple algebras.

=== Examples over local rings ===
Given a local commutative ring $(R,\mathfrak{m})$, an $R$-algebra $A$ is Azumaya if and only if $A$ is free of positive finite rank as an $R$-module, and the algebra $A\otimes_R(R/\mathfrak{m})$ is a central simple algebra over $R/\mathfrak{m}$, hence all examples come from central simple algebras over $R/\mathfrak{m}$.

=== Cyclic algebras ===
There is a class of Azumaya algebras called cyclic algebras which generate all similarity classes of Azumaya algebras over a field $K$, hence all elements in the Brauer group $\text{Br}(K)$ (defined below). Given a finite cyclic Galois field extension $L/K$ of degree $n$, for every $b \in K^*$ and any generator $\sigma \in \text{Gal}(L/K)$ there is a twisted polynomial ring $L[x]_\sigma$, also denoted $A(\sigma,b)$, generated by an element $x$ such that

$$x^n =b$$

and the following commutation property holds:

$$l\cdot x = \sigma(x)\cdot l.$$

As a vector space over $L$, $L[x]_\sigma$ has basis $1,x,x^2,\ldots, x^{n-1}$ with multiplication given by

$$x^i \cdot x^j = \begin{cases}
x^{i + j} & \text{ if } i + j < n \\
x^{i + j - n}b & \text{ if } i + j \geq n \\
\end{cases}$$

Note that give a geometrically integral variety $X/K$, there is also an associated cyclic algebra for the quotient field extension $\text{Frac}(X_L)/\text{Frac}(X)$.

== Brauer group of a ring ==
Over fields, there is a cohomological classification of Azumaya algebras using Étale cohomology. In fact, this group, called the Brauer group, can be also defined as the similarity classes of Azumaya algebras over a local ring $R$, where rings $A,A'$ are similar if there is an isomorphism

$$A\otimes_RM_n(R) \cong A'\otimes_RM_m(R)$$

of rings for some natural numbers $n,m$. Then, this equivalence is in fact an equivalence relation, and if $A_1 \sim A_1'$, $A_2 \sim A_2'$, then $A_1\otimes_RA_2 \sim A_1'\otimes_RA_2'$, showing

$$[A_1]\otimes [A_2] = [A_1\otimes_R A_2]$$

is a well defined operation. This forms a group structure on the set of such equivalence classes called the Brauer group, denoted $\text{Br}(R)$. Another definition is given by the torsion subgroup of the etale cohomology group

$$\text{Br}_\text{coh}(R) := \text{H}_{et}^2(\text{Spec}(R),\mathbb{G}_m)_\text{tors}$$

which is called the cohomological Brauer group. These two definitions agree when $R$ is a field.

=== Brauer group using Galois cohomology ===
There is another equivalent definition of the Brauer group using Galois cohomology. For a field extension $E/F$ there is a cohomological Brauer group defined as

$$\text{Br}^\text{coh}(E/F):= H^2_{\text{Gal}}(\text{Gal}(E/F), E^\times)$$

and the cohomological Brauer group for $F$ is defined as

$$\text{Br}^\text{coh}(F) = \underset{E/F}{\text{colim}} H^2_{\text{Gal}}(\text{Gal}(E/F), E^\times)$$

where the colimit is taken over all finite Galois field extensions.

==== Computation for a local field ====
Over a local non-archimedean field $F$, such as the p-adic numbers $\mathbb{Q}_p$, local class field theory gives the isomorphism of abelian groups:^{pg 193}

$$\text{Br}^\text{coh}(F) \cong \Q/\Z.$$

This is because given abelian field extensions $E_2/E_1/F$ there is a short exact sequence of Galois groups

$$0 \to \text{Gal}(E_2/E_1) \to \text{Gal}(E_2/F) \to \text{Gal}(E_1/F) \to 0$$

and from Local class field theory, there is the following commutative diagram:

$$\begin{matrix}
H^2_{\text{Gal}}(\text{Gal}(E_2/F),E_1^\times) &\to& H^2_{\text{Gal}}( \text{Gal}(E_1/F),E_1^\times) \\
\downarrow & & \downarrow \\
\left(\frac{1}{[E_2:E_1]}\Z\right)/\Z & \to & \left(\frac{1}{[E_1:F]}\Z\right)/\Z
\end{matrix}$$

where the vertical maps are isomorphisms and the horizontal maps are injections.

=== n-torsion for a field ===
Recall that there is the Kummer sequence

$$1 \to \mu_n \to \mathbb{G}_m \xrightarrow{\cdot n} \mathbb{G}_m \to 1$$

giving a long exact sequence in cohomology for a field $F$. Since Hilbert's Theorem 90 implies $H^1(F,\mathbb{G}_m) = 0$, there is an associated short exact sequence

$$0 \to H^2_{et}(F,\mu_n) \to \text{Br}(F) \xrightarrow{\cdot n} \text{Br}(F) \to 0$$

showing the second etale cohomology group with coefficients in the $n$th roots of unity $\mu_n$ is

$$H^2_{et}(F,\mu_n) = \text{Br}(F)_{n\text{-tors}}.$$

=== Generators of n-torsion classes in the Brauer group over a field ===
The Galois symbol, or norm-residue symbol, is a map from the $n$-torsion Milnor K-theory group $K_2^M(F)\otimes \Z /n$ to the etale cohomology group $H^2_{et}(F,\mu_n^{\otimes 2})$, denoted by

$R_{n,F}:K_2^M(F)\otimes_\Z \Z /n\Z \to H^2_{et}(F,\mu_n^{\otimes 2})$

It comes from the composition of the cup product in etale cohomology with the Hilbert's Theorem 90 isomorphism

$$\chi_{n,F}:F^*\otimes_\Z\Z/n \to H^1_\text{et}(F,\mu_n)$$

hence

$$R_{n,F}(\{a,b\}) = \chi_{n,F}(a)\cup \chi_{n,F}(b)$$

It turns out this map factors through $H^2_\text{et}(F,\mu_n) = \text{Br}(F)_{n\text{-tors}}$, whose class for $\{a,b \}$ is represented by a cyclic algebra $[A(\sigma, b)]$. For the Kummer extension $E/F$ where $E = F(\sqrt[n]{a})$, take a generator $\sigma \in \text{Gal}(E/F)$ of the cyclic group, and construct $[A(\sigma,b)]$. There is an alternative, yet equivalent construction through Galois cohomology and etale cohomology. Consider the short exact sequence of trivial $\text{Gal}(\overline{F}/F)$-modules

$$0 \to \Z  \to \Z  \to \Z /n \to 0$$

The long exact sequence yields a map

$$H^1_\text{Gal}(F,\Z /n) \xrightarrow{\delta} H^2_\text{Gal}(F,\Z )$$

For the unique character

$$\chi:\text{Gal}(E/F) \to \Z /n$$

with $\chi(\sigma) = 1$, there is a unique lift

$$\overline{\chi}:\text{Gal}(\overline{F}/F) \to \Z /n$$

and

$$\delta(\overline{\chi})\cup (b) = [A(\sigma,b)] \in \text{Br}(F)$$

note the class $(b)$ is from the Hilberts theorem 90 map $\chi_{n,F}(b)$. Then, since there exists a primitive root of unity $\zeta \in \mu_n \subset F$, there is also a class

$$\delta(\overline{\chi})\cup(b) \cup (\zeta) \in H^2_\text{et}(F,\mu_n^{\otimes 2})$$

It turns out this is precisely the class $R_{n,F}(\{a,b\})$. Because of the norm residue isomorphism theorem, $R_{n,F}$ is an isomorphism and the $n$-torsion classes in $\text{Br}(F)_{n\text{-tors}}$ are generated by the cyclic algebras $[A(\sigma,b)]$.

== Skolem–Noether theorem ==
One of the important structure results about Azumaya algebras is the Skolem–Noether theorem: given a local commutative ring $R$ and an Azumaya algebra $R \to A$, the only automorphisms of $A$ are inner. Meaning, the following map is surjective:

$$\begin{cases} A^* \to \text{Aut}(A) \\ a \mapsto (x \mapsto a^{-1}xa) \end{cases}$$

where $A^*$ is the group of units in $A.$ This is important because it directly relates to the cohomological classification of similarity classes of Azumaya algebras over a scheme. In particular, it implies an Azumaya algebra has structure group $\text{PGL}_n$ for some $n$, and the Čech cohomology group

$$\check{H}^1((X)_{et},\text{PGL}_n)$$

gives a cohomological classification of such bundles. Then, this can be related to $H^2_\text{et}(X,\mathbb{G}_m)$ using the exact sequence

$$1 \to \mathbb{G}_m \to \text{GL}_n \to \text{PGL}_n \to 1$$

It turns out the image of $H^1$ is a subgroup of the torsion subgroup $H^2_\text{et}(X,\mathbb{G}_m)_{tors}$.

== On a scheme ==
An Azumaya algebra on a scheme X with structure sheaf $\mathcal{O}_X$, according to the original Grothendieck seminar, is a sheaf $\mathcal{A}$ of $\mathcal{O}_X$-algebras that is étale locally isomorphic to a matrix algebra sheaf; one should, however, add the condition that each matrix algebra sheaf is of positive rank. This definition makes an Azumaya algebra on $(X,\mathcal{O}_X)$ into a 'twisted-form' of the sheaf $M_n(\mathcal{O}_X)$. Milne, Étale Cohomology, starts instead from the definition that it is a sheaf $\mathcal{A}$ of $\mathcal{O}_X$-algebras whose stalk $\mathcal{A}_x$ at each point $x$ is an Azumaya algebra over the local ring $\mathcal{O}_{X,x}$ in the sense given above.

Two Azumaya algebras $\mathcal{A}_1$ and $\mathcal{A}_2$ are equivalent if there exist locally free sheaves $\mathcal{E}_1$ and $\mathcal{E}_2$ of finite positive rank at every point such that

$A_1\otimes\mathrm{End}_{\mathcal{O}_X}(\mathcal{E}_1) \simeq A_2\otimes\mathrm{End}_{\mathcal{O}_X}(\mathcal{E}_2),$

where $\mathrm{End}_{\mathcal{O}_X}(\mathcal{E}_i)$ is the endomorphism sheaf of $\mathcal{E}_i$. The Brauer group $B(X)$ of $X$ (an analogue of the Brauer group of a field) is the set of equivalence classes of Azumaya algebras. The group operation is given by tensor product, and the inverse is given by the opposite algebra. Note that this is distinct from the cohomological Brauer group which is defined as $H^2_\text{et}(X,\mathbb{G}_m)$.

=== Example over Spec(Z[1/n]) ===
The construction of a quaternion algebra over a field can be globalized to $\text{Spec}(\Z[1/n])$ by considering the noncommutative $\Z [1/n]$-algebra

$$A_{a,b} = \frac{\Z[1/n]\langle i, j, k \rangle}{i^2 - a, j^2 - b, ij - k, ji + k}$$

then, as a sheaf of $\mathcal{O}_X$-algebras, $\mathcal{A}_{a,b}$ has the structure of an Azumaya algebra. The reason for restricting to the open affine set $\text{Spec}(\Z[1/n]) \hookrightarrow \text{Spec}(\Z)$ is because the quaternion algebra is a division algebra over the points $(p)$ is and only if the Hilbert symbol

$$(a,b)_p = 1$$

which is true at all but finitely many primes.

=== Example over P^{n} ===
Over $\mathbb{P}^n_k$ Azumaya algebras can be constructed as $\mathcal{End}_k(\mathcal{E})\otimes_k A$ for an Azumaya algebra $A$ over a field $k$. For example, the endomorphism sheaf of $\mathcal{O}(a)\oplus \mathcal{O}(b)$ is the matrix sheaf

$$\mathcal{End}_k(\mathcal{O}(a)\oplus \mathcal{O}(b)) = \begin{pmatrix} \mathcal{O} & \mathcal{O}(b-a) \\ \mathcal{O}(a-b) & \mathcal{O}
\end{pmatrix}$$

so an Azumaya algebra over $\mathbb{P}^n_k$ can be constructed from this sheaf tensored with an Azumaya algebra $A$ over $k$, such as a quaternion algebra.

=== Example in positive characteristic ===
Let $X$ be a smooth variety over a field in characteristic $p>0$. Let $X'$ be the Frobenius twist of $X$. Let $D_X$ be the sheaf of rings of differential operators on $X$. Then $D_X$ naturally gives rise to an Azumaya algebra on the cotangent bundle $T^*X'$ of $X'$. This Azumaya algebra is used in the positive characteristic versions of the Geometric Langlands correspondence and the Nonabelian Hodge correspondence.

== Applications ==
There have been significant applications of Azumaya algebras in diophantine geometry, following work of Yuri Manin. The Manin obstruction to the Hasse principle is defined using the Brauer group of schemes.

== See also ==
- Gerbe
- Class field theory
- Algebraic K-theory
- Motivic cohomology
- Norm residue isomorphism theorem
