= Albert–Brauer–Hasse–Noether theorem =

Theorem in number theory

In algebraic number theory, the Albert–Brauer–Hasse–Noether theorem states that a central simple algebra over an algebraic number field K which splits over every completion K_{v} is a matrix algebra over K. The theorem is an example of a local-global principle in algebraic number theory and leads to a complete description of finite-dimensional division algebras over algebraic number fields in terms of their local invariants. It was proved independently by Richard Brauer, Helmut Hasse, and Emmy Noether and by Abraham Adrian Albert.

== Statement of the theorem ==
Let A be a central simple algebra of rank d over an algebraic number field K. Suppose that for any valuation v, A splits over the corresponding local field K_{v}:

$$A\otimes_K K_v \simeq M_d(K_v).$$

Then A is isomorphic to the matrix algebra M_{d}(K).

== Applications ==
Using the theory of Brauer group, one shows that two central simple algebras A and B over an algebraic number field K are isomorphic over K if and only if their completions A_{v} and B_{v} are isomorphic over the completion K_{v} for every v.

Together with the Grunwald–Wang theorem, the Albert–Brauer–Hasse–Noether theorem implies that every central simple algebra over an algebraic number field is cyclic, i.e. can be obtained by an explicit construction from a cyclic field extension L/K .

== See also ==
- Class field theory
- Hasse norm theorem
