= Hasse invariant =

In mathematics, Hasse invariant may refer to:

- Hasse invariant of an algebra
- Hasse invariant of an elliptic curve
- Hasse invariant of a quadratic form
