= Principal homogeneous space =

Set on which a group acts freely and transitively

In mathematics, a principal homogeneous space, or torsor, for a group G is a homogeneous space X for G in which the stabilizer subgroup of every point is trivial. Equivalently, a principal homogeneous space for a group G is a non-empty set X on which G acts freely and transitively (meaning that, for any x, y in X, there exists a unique g in G such that x·g = y, where · denotes the (right) action of G on X). An analogous definition holds in other categories, where, for example,

- G is a topological group, X is a topological space and the action is continuous,
- G is a Lie group, X is a smooth manifold and the action is smooth,
- G is an algebraic group, X is an algebraic variety and the action is regular.

== Definition ==
If G is nonabelian then one must distinguish between left and right torsors according to whether the action is on the left or right. In this article, we will use right actions.

To state the definition more explicitly, X is a G-torsor or G-principal homogeneous space if X is nonempty and is equipped with a map (in the appropriate category) X × G → X such that

x·1 = x
x·(gh) = (x·g)·h

for all x ∈ X and all g,h ∈ G, and such that the map X × G → X × X given by

$$(x,g) \mapsto (x,x\cdot g)$$

is an isomorphism (of sets, or topological spaces or ..., as appropriate, i.e. in the category in question).

Note that this means that X and G are isomorphic (in the category in question; not as groups: see the following). However—and this is the essential point—there is no preferred 'identity' point in X. That is, X looks exactly like G except that which point is the identity has been forgotten. (This concept is often used in mathematics as a way of passing to a more intrinsic point of view, under the heading 'throw away the origin'.)

Since X is not a group, we cannot multiply elements; we can, however, take their "quotient". That is, there is a map X × X → G that sends (x,y) to the unique element g = x \ y ∈ G such that y = x·g.

The composition of the latter operation with the right group action, however, yields a ternary operation X × (X × X) → X, which serves as an affine generalization of group multiplication and which is sufficient to both characterize a principal homogeneous space algebraically and intrinsically characterize the group it is associated with. If we denote $x/y \cdot z \,:=\, x \cdot (y\backslash z)$ the result of this ternary operation, then the following identities

$$x/y \cdot y = x = y/y \cdot x$$
$$v/w \cdot (x/y \cdot z) = (v/w \cdot x)/y \cdot z$$

will suffice to define a principal homogeneous space, while the additional property

$$x/y \cdot z = z/y \cdot x$$

identifies those spaces that are associated with abelian groups. The group may be defined as formal quotients $x \backslash y$ subject to the equivalence relation

$$x \backslash y = u \backslash v \quad \text{iff} \quad v = u/x \cdot y$$,

with the group product, identity and inverse defined, respectively, by

$$(x \backslash y) \cdot (u \backslash v) = x \backslash (y/u \cdot v) = (u/y \cdot x)\backslash v$$,
$$e = x \backslash x$$,
$$(x \backslash y)^{-1} = y \backslash x,$$

and the group action by

$$x\cdot (y \backslash z) = x/y \cdot z.$$

== Examples ==
Every group G can itself be thought of as a left or right G-torsor under the natural action of left or right multiplication.

Another example is the affine space concept: the idea of the affine space A underlying a vector space V can be said succinctly by saying that A is a principal homogeneous space for V acting as the additive group of translations.

The flags of any regular polytope form a torsor for its symmetry group.

Given a vector space V we can take G to be the general linear group GL(V), and X to be the set of all (ordered) bases of V. Then G acts on X in the way that it acts on vectors of V; and it acts transitively since any basis can be transformed via G to any other. What is more, a linear transformation fixing each vector of a basis will fix all v in V, and hence be the neutral element of the general linear group GL(V) : so that X is indeed a principal homogeneous space. One way to follow basis-dependence in a linear algebra argument is to track variables x in X. Similarly, the space of orthonormal bases (the Stiefel manifold $V_n(\mathbf{R}^n)$ of n-frames) is a principal homogeneous space for the orthogonal group.

In category theory, if two objects X and Y are isomorphic, then the isomorphisms between them, Iso(X,Y), form a torsor for the automorphism group of X, Aut(X), and likewise for Aut(Y); a choice of isomorphism between the objects gives rise to an isomorphism between these groups and identifies the torsor with these two groups, giving the torsor a group structure (as it has now a base point).

== Applications ==
The principal homogeneous space concept is a special case of that of principal bundle: it means a principal bundle with base a single point. In other words the local theory of principal bundles is that of a family of principal homogeneous spaces depending on some parameters in the base. The 'origin' can be supplied by a section of the bundle—such sections are usually assumed to exist locally on the base—the bundle being locally trivial, so that the local structure is that of a cartesian product. But sections will often not exist globally. For example a differential manifold M has a principal bundle of frames associated to its tangent bundle. A global section will exist (by definition) only when M is parallelizable, which implies strong topological restrictions.

In number theory there is a (superficially different) reason to consider principal homogeneous spaces, for elliptic curves E defined over a field K (and more general abelian varieties). Once this was understood, various other examples were collected under the heading, for other algebraic groups: quadratic forms for orthogonal groups, and Severi–Brauer varieties for projective linear groups being two.

The reason of the interest for Diophantine equations, in the elliptic curve case, is that K may not be algebraically closed. There can exist curves C that have no point defined over K, and which become isomorphic over a larger field to E, which by definition has a point over K to serve as identity element for its addition law. That is, for this case we should distinguish C that have genus 1, from elliptic curves E that have a K-point (or, in other words, provide a Diophantine equation that has a solution in K). The curves C turn out to be torsors over E, and form a set carrying a rich structure in the case that K is a number field (the theory of the Selmer group). In fact a typical plane cubic curve C over Q has no particular reason to have a rational point; the standard Weierstrass model always does, namely the point at infinity, but you need a point over K to put C into that form over K.

This theory has been developed with great attention to local analysis, leading to the definition of the Tate–Shafarevich group. In general the approach of taking the torsor theory, easy over an algebraically closed field, and trying to get back 'down' to a smaller field is an aspect of descent. It leads at once to questions of Galois cohomology, since the torsors represent classes in group cohomology H^{1}.

== Other usage ==
The concept of a principal homogeneous space can also be globalized as follows. Let X be a "space" (a scheme/manifold/topological space etc.), and let G be a group over X, i.e., a group object in the category of spaces over X. In this case, a (right, say) G-torsor E on X is a space E (of the same type) over X with a (right) G action such that the morphism

$$E \times_X G \rightarrow E \times_X E$$

given by

$$(x,g) \mapsto (x,xg)$$

is an isomorphism in the appropriate category, and such that E is locally trivial on X, in that E → X acquires a section locally on X. Isomorphism classes of torsors in this sense correspond to classes in the cohomology group H^{1}(X,G).

When we are in the smooth manifold category, then a G-torsor (for G a Lie group) is then precisely a principal G-bundle as defined above.

Example: if G is a compact Lie group (say), then $EG$ is a G-torsor over the classifying space $BG$.

== See also ==
- Homogeneous space
- Heap (mathematics)
