= Weil–Châtelet group =

In arithmetic geometry, the Weil–Châtelet group or WC-group of an algebraic group such as an abelian variety A defined over a field K is the abelian group of principal homogeneous spaces for A, defined over K. John Tate (1958) named it for François Châtelet (1946) who introduced it for elliptic curves, and André Weil (1955), who introduced it for more general groups. It plays a basic role in the arithmetic of abelian varieties, in particular for elliptic curves, because of its connection with infinite descent.

It can be defined directly from Galois cohomology, as $H^1(G_K,A)$, where $G_K$ is the absolute Galois group of K. It is of particular interest for local fields and global fields, such as algebraic number fields. For K a finite field, Friedrich Karl Schmidt (1931) proved that the Weil–Châtelet group is trivial for elliptic curves, and Serge Lang (1956) proved that it is trivial for any connected algebraic group.

== See also ==
The Tate–Shafarevich group of an abelian variety A defined over a number field K consists of the elements of the Weil–Châtelet group that become trivial in all of the completions of K.

The Selmer group, named after Ernst S. Selmer, of A with respect to an isogeny $f\colon A\to B$ of abelian varieties is a related group which can be defined in terms of Galois cohomology as

$$\mathrm{Sel}^{(f)}(A/K)=\bigcap_v\mathrm{ker}(H^1(G_K,\mathrm{ker}(f))\rightarrow H^1(G_{K_v},A_v[f])/\mathrm{im}(\kappa_v))$$

where A_{v}[f] denotes the f-torsion of A_{v} and $\kappa_v$ is the local Kummer map

$$B_v(K_v)/f(A_v(K_v))\rightarrow H^1(G_{K_v},A_v[f])$$.
