= Conic bundle =

In algebraic geometry, a conic bundle is an algebraic variety that appears as a solution to a Cartesian equation of the form:

$$X^2 + aXY + b Y^2 = P (T).\,$$

Conic bundles can be considered as either a Severi–Brauer or Châtelet surface. This can be a double covering of a ruled surface. It can be associated with the symbol $(a, P)$ in the second Galois cohomology of the field $k$ through an isomorphism. In practice, it is more commonly observed as a surface with a well-understood divisor class group, and the simplest cases share with Del Pezzo surfaces the property of being a rational surface. But many problems of contemporary mathematics remain open, notably, for those examples which are not rational, the question of unirationality.

== Expression ==
In order to properly express a conic bundle, one must first simplify the quadratic form on the left side. This can be achieved through a transformation, such as:

$$X^2 - aY^2 = P (T). \,$$

This is followed by placement in projective space to complete the surface at infinity, which may be achieved by writing the equation in homogeneous coordinates and expressing the first visible part of the fiber:

$$X^2 - aY^2 = P (T) Z^2. \,$$

That is not enough to complete the fiber as non-singular (smooth and proper), and then glue it to infinity by a change of classical maps.

Seen from infinity, (i.e. through the change $T\mapsto T'=1/ T$), the same fiber (excepted the fibers $T = 0$ and $T '= 0$), written as the set of solutions $X'^2 - aY'^2= P^* (T') Z'^2$ where $P^* (T ')$ appears naturally as the reciprocal polynomial of $P$. Details are below about the map-change $[x ':y': z ']$.

=== The fiber c ===
For the sake of simplicity, suppose the field $k$ is of characteristic zero and denote by $m$ any nonzero integer. Denote by $P(T)$ a polynomial with coefficients in the field $k$, of degree $2m$ or $2m-1$, without multiple roots. Consider the scalar $a$.

One defines the reciprocal polynomial by $P^*(T')=T^{2m}P(1/ T)$, and the conic bundle $F_{a,P}$ as follows:

=== Definition ===
$F_{a,P}$ is the surface obtained as "gluing" of the two surfaces $U$ and $U'$ of equations

$$X^2 - aY^ 2 = P (T) Z^2$$

and

$$X '^2 - aY'^2 = P^* (T ') Z'^ 2$$

along the open sets by isomorphism

$x '= x, y' = y,$ and $z '= z t^m$.

One shows the following result:

=== Fundamental property ===
The surface F_{a,P} is a k smooth and proper surface, the mapping defined by

$$p:  U \to P_{1, k}$$

by

$$([x:y:z],t)\mapsto t$$

and the same definition applied to $U '$ gives to F_{a,P} a structure of conic bundle over P_{1,k}.

== See also ==
- Algebraic surface
- Intersection number (algebraic geometry)
- List of complex and algebraic surfaces
