= Cohomological invariant =

In mathematics, a cohomological invariant of an algebraic group G over a field is an invariant of forms of G taking values in a Galois cohomology group.

== Definition ==
Suppose that G is an algebraic group defined over a field K, and choose a separably closed field K̅ containing K. For a finite extension L of K in K̅ let Γ_{L} be the absolute Galois group of L. The first cohomology H^{1}(L, G) = H^{1}(Γ_{L}, G) is a set classifying the G-torsors over L, and is a functor of L.

A cohomological invariant of G of dimension d taking values in a Γ_{K}-module M is a natural transformation of functors (of L) from H^{1}(L, G) to H^{d}(L, M).

In other words, a cohomological invariant associates an element of an abelian cohomology group to elements of a non-abelian cohomology set.

More generally, if A is any functor from finitely generated extensions of a field to sets, then a cohomological invariant of A of dimension d taking values in a Γ-module M is a natural transformation of functors (of L) from A to H^{d}(L, M).

The cohomological invariants of a fixed group G or functor A, dimension d and Galois module M form an abelian group denoted by Inv^{d}(G,M) or Inv^{d}(A,M).

== Examples ==
- Suppose A is the functor taking a field to the isomorphism classes of dimension n etale algebras over it. The cohomological invariants with coefficients in Z/2Z is a free module over the cohomology of k with a basis of elements of degrees 0, 1, 2, ..., m where m is the integer part of n/2.
- The Hasse−Witt invariant of a quadratic form is essentially a dimension 2 cohomological invariant of the corresponding spin group taking values in a group of order 2.
- If G is a quotient of a group by a smooth finite central subgroup C, then the boundary map of the corresponding exact sequence gives a dimension 2 cohomological invariant with values in C. If G is a special orthogonal group and the cover is the spin group then the corresponding invariant is essentially the Hasse−Witt invariant.
- If G is the orthogonal group of a quadratic form in characteristic not 2, then there are Stiefel–Whitney classes for each positive dimension which are cohomological invariants with values in Z/2Z. (These are not the topological Stiefel–Whitney classes of a real vector bundle, but are the analogues of them for vector bundles over a scheme.) For dimension 1 this is essentially the discriminant, and for dimension 2 it is essentially the Hasse−Witt invariant.
- The Arason invariant e_{3} is a dimension 3 invariant of some even dimensional quadratic forms q with trivial discriminant and trivial Hasse−Witt invariant. It takes values in Z/2Z. It can be used to construct a dimension 3 cohomological invariant of the corresponding spin group as follows. If u is in H^{1}(K, Spin(q)) and p is the quadratic form corresponding to the image of u in H^{1}(K, O(q)), then e_{3}(p−q) is the value of the dimension 3 cohomological invariant on u.
- The Merkurjev−Suslin invariant is a dimension 3 invariant of a special linear group of a central simple algebra of rank n taking values in the tensor square of the group of nth roots of unity. When n=2 this is essentially the Arason invariant.
- For absolutely simple simply connected groups G, the Rost invariant is a dimension 3 invariant taking values in Q/Z(2) that in some sense generalizes the Arason invariant and the Merkurjev−Suslin invariant to more general groups.
