= Rost invariant =

In mathematics, the Rost invariant is a cohomological invariant of an absolutely simple simply connected algebraic group G over a field k, which associates an element of the Galois cohomology group H^{3}(k, Q/Z(2)) to a principal homogeneous space for G. Here the coefficient group Q/Z(2) is the tensor product of the group of roots of unity of an algebraic closure of k with itself. Markus Rost first introduced the invariant for groups of type F_{4} and later extended it to more general groups in unpublished work that was summarized by Serre in 1995.

The Rost invariant is a generalization of the Arason invariant.

== Definition ==
Suppose that G is an absolutely almost simple simply connected algebraic group over a field k. The Rost invariant associates an element a(P) of the Galois cohomology group H^{3}(k,Q/Z(2)) to a G-torsor P.

The element a(P) is constructed as follows. For any extension K of k there is an exact sequence

$$0\rightarrow H^3(K,\mathbf{Q}/\mathbf{Z}(2)) \rightarrow H^3_{et}(P_K, \mathbf{Q}/\mathbf{Z}(2)) \rightarrow \mathbf{Q}/\mathbf{Z}$$

where the middle group is the étale cohomology group and Q/Z is the geometric part of the cohomology. Choose a finite extension K of k such that G splits over K and P has a rational point over K. Then the exact sequence splits canonically as a direct sum so the étale cohomology group contains Q/Z canonically. The invariant a(P) is the image of the element 1/[K:k] of Q/Z under the trace map from H^{3}_{et}(P_{K},Q/Z(2)) to H^{3}_{et}(P,Q/Z(2)), which lies in the subgroup H^{3}(k,Q/Z(2)).

These invariants a(P) are functorial in field extensions K of k; in other words the fit together to form an element of the cyclic group Inv^{3}(G,Q/Z(2)) of cohomological invariants of the group G, which consists of morphisms of the functor K→H^{1}(K,G) to the functor K→H^{3}(K,Q/Z(2)). This element of Inv^{3}(G,Q/Z(2)) is a generator of the group and is called the Rost invariant of G.
