= Cyclic algebra =

In algebra, a cyclic division algebra is one of the basic examples of a division algebra over a field and plays a key role in the theory of central simple algebras.

== Definition ==
Let A be a finite-dimensional central simple algebra over a field F. Then A is said to be cyclic if it contains a strictly maximal subfield E such that E/F is a cyclic field extension (i.e., the Galois group is a cyclic group).

== See also ==
- Factor system § Cyclic algebras – cyclic algebras described by factor systems.
- Brauer group § Cyclic algebras – cyclic algebras are representative of Brauer classes.
