= Arithmetic topology =

Area of mathematics

Arithmetic topology is an area of mathematics that is a combination of algebraic number theory and topology. It establishes an analogy between number fields and closed, orientable 3-manifolds.

== Analogies ==
The following are some of the analogies used by mathematicians between number fields and 3-manifolds:

1. A number field corresponds to a closed, orientable 3-manifold
2. Ideals in the ring of integers correspond to links, and prime ideals correspond to knots.
3. The field Q of rational numbers corresponds to the 3-sphere.

Expanding on the last two examples, there is an analogy between knots and prime numbers in which one considers "links" between primes. The triple of primes (13, 61, 937) are "linked" modulo 2 (the Rédei symbol is −1) but are "pairwise unlinked" modulo 2 (the Legendre symbols are all 1). Therefore these primes have been called a "proper Borromean triple modulo 2" or "mod 2 Borromean primes".

== History ==
In the 1960s topological interpretations of class field theory were given by John Tate based on Galois cohomology, and also by Michael Artin and Jean-Louis Verdier based on étale cohomology. Then David Mumford (and independently Yuri Manin) came up with an analogy between prime ideals and knots which was further explored by Barry Mazur. In the 1990s Reznikov and Kapranov began studying these analogies, coining the term arithmetic topology for this area of study.

== See also ==
- Arithmetic geometry
- Arithmetic dynamics
- Topological quantum field theory
- Langlands program
