= Simple (abstract algebra) =

In mathematics, the term simple is used to describe an algebraic structure which in some sense cannot be divided by a smaller structure of the same type. Put another way, an algebraic structure is simple if the kernel of every homomorphism is either the whole structure or a single element. Some examples are:

- A group is called a simple group if it does not contain a nontrivial proper normal subgroup.
- A ring is called a simple ring if it does not contain a nontrivial two sided ideal.
- A module is called a simple module if it does not contain a nontrivial submodule.
- An algebra is called a simple algebra if it does not contain a nontrivial two sided ideal.

The general pattern is that the structure admits no non-trivial congruence relations.

The term is used differently in semigroup theory. A semigroup is said to be simple if it has no nontrivial ideals, or equivalently, if Green's relation J is the universal relation. Not every congruence on a semigroup is associated with an ideal, so a simple semigroup may have nontrivial congruences. A semigroup with no nontrivial congruences is called congruence simple.

== See also ==
- Semisimple
- Simple algebra (universal algebra)
- Simple (philosophy)
