= Arason invariant =

In mathematics, the Arason invariant is a cohomological invariant associated to a quadratic form of even rank and trivial discriminant and Clifford invariant over a field k of characteristic not 2, taking values in H^{3}(k,Z/2Z). It was introduced by Jón Arason in 1975.

The Rost invariant is a generalization of the Arason invariant to other algebraic groups.

== Definition ==
Suppose that W(k) is the Witt ring of quadratic forms over a field k and I is the ideal of forms of even dimension. The Arason invariant is a group homomorphism from I^{3} to the Galois cohomology group H^{3}(k,Z/2Z). It is determined by the property that on the 8-dimensional diagonal form with entries 1, –a, –b, ab, -c, ac, bc, -abc (the 3-fold Pfister form«a,b,c») it is given by the cup product of the classes of a, b, c in H^{1}(k,Z/2Z) = k*/k*^{2}. The Arason invariant vanishes on I^{4}, and it follows from the Milnor conjecture proved by Voevodsky that it is an isomorphism from I^{3}/I^{4} to H^{3}(k,Z/2Z).
