= Weber's theorem =

Weber's theorem may refer to:

- Kronecker–Weber theorem
- Weber's theorem (algebraic curves)
