= Rational point =

In algebraic geometry, a point with rational coordinates

In number theory and algebraic geometry, a rational point of an algebraic variety is a point whose coordinates belong to a given field. If the field is not mentioned, the field of rational numbers is generally understood. If the field is the field of real numbers, a rational point is more commonly called a real point.

Understanding rational points is a central goal of number theory and Diophantine geometry. For example, Fermat's Last Theorem may be restated as: for n > 2, the Fermat curve of equation $x^n+y^n=1$ has no other rational points than (1, 0), (0, 1), and, if n is even, (–1, 0) and (0, –1).

== Definition ==
Given a field k, and an algebraically closed extension K of k, an affine variety X over k is the set of common zeros in K^{n} of a collection of polynomials with coefficients in k:

$$\begin{align}
& f_1(x_1,\ldots,x_n)=0, \\
& \qquad \quad \vdots \\
& f_r(x_1,\dots,x_n)=0.
\end{align}$$

These common zeros are called the points of X.

A k-rational point (or k-point) of X is a point of X that belongs to k^{n}, that is, a sequence $(a_1,\dots,a_n)$ of n elements of k such that $f_j(a_1,\dots,a_n) = 0$ for all j. The set of k-rational points of X is often denoted X(k).

Sometimes, when the field k is understood, or when k is the field $\Q$ of rational numbers, one says "rational point" instead of "k-rational point".

For example, the rational points of the unit circle of equation

$$x^2+y^2=1$$

are the pairs of rational numbers

$$\left(\frac ac, \frac bc\right),$$

where (a, b, c) is a Pythagorean triple.

The concept also makes sense in more general settings. A projective variety X in projective space $\mathbb P^n$ over a field k can be defined by a collection of homogeneous polynomial equations in variables $x_0,\dots,x_n.$ A k-point of $\mathbb P^n,$ written $[a_0,\dots,a_n],$ is given by a sequence of n + 1 elements of k, not all zero, with the understanding that multiplying all of $a_0,\dots,a_n$ by the same nonzero element of k gives the same point in projective space. Then a k-point of X means a k-point of $\mathbb P^n$ at which the given polynomials vanish.

More generally, let X be a scheme over a field k. This means that a morphism of schemes f: X → Spec(k) is given. Then a k-point of X means a section of this morphism, that is, a morphism a: Spec(k) → X such that the composition fa is the identity on Spec(k). This agrees with the previous definitions when X is an affine or projective variety (viewed as a scheme over k).

When X is a variety over an algebraically closed field k, much of the structure of X is determined by its set X(k) of k-rational points. For a general field k, however, X(k) gives only partial information about X. In particular, for a variety X over a field k and any field extension E of k, X also determines the set X(E) of E-rational points of X, meaning the set of solutions of the equations defining X with values in E.

Example: Let X be the conic curve $x^2+y^2=-1$ in the affine plane A^{2} over the real numbers $\R.$ Then the set of real points $X(\R)$ is empty, because the square of any real number is nonnegative. On the other hand, in the terminology of algebraic geometry, the algebraic variety X over $\R$ is not empty, because the set of complex points $X(\C)$ is not empty.

More generally, for a scheme X over a commutative ring R and any commutative R-algebra S, the set X(S) of S-points of X means the set of morphisms Spec(S) → X over Spec(R). The scheme X is determined up to isomorphism by the functor S ↦ X(S); this is the philosophy of identifying a scheme with its functor of points. Another formulation is that the scheme X over R determines a scheme X_{S} over S by base change, and the S-points of X (over R) can be identified with the S-points of X_{S} (over S).

The theory of Diophantine equations traditionally meant the study of integral points, meaning solutions of polynomial equations in the integers $\Z$ rather than the rationals $\Q.$ For homogeneous polynomial equations such as $x^3+y^3=z^3,$ the two problems are essentially equivalent, since every rational point can be scaled to become an integral point.

== Rational points on curves ==
Much of number theory can be viewed as the study of rational points of algebraic varieties, a convenient setting being smooth projective varieties. For smooth projective curves, the behavior of rational points depends strongly on the genus of the curve.

=== Genus 0 ===
Every smooth projective curve X of genus zero over a field k is isomorphic to a conic (degree 2) curve in $\mathbb P^2.$ If X has a k-rational point, then it is isomorphic to $\mathbb P^1$ over k, and so its k-rational points are completely understood. If k is the field $\Q$ of rational numbers (or more generally a number field), there is an algorithm to determine whether a given conic has a rational point, based on the Hasse principle: a conic over $\Q$ has a rational point if and only if it has a point over all completions of $\Q,$ that is, over $\R$ and all p-adic fields $\Q_p.$

=== Genus 1 ===
It is harder to determine whether a curve of genus 1 has a rational point. The Hasse principle fails in this case: for example, by Ernst Selmer, the cubic curve $3x^3+4y^3+5z^3 = 0$ in $\mathbb P^2$ has a point over all completions of $\Q,$ but no rational point. The failure of the Hasse principle for curves of genus 1 is measured by the Tate–Shafarevich group.

If X is a curve of genus 1 with a k-rational point p_{0}, then X is called an elliptic curve over k. In this case, X has the structure of a commutative algebraic group (with p_{0} as the zero element), and so the set X(k) of k-rational points is an abelian group. The Mordell–Weil theorem says that for an elliptic curve (or, more generally, an abelian variety) X over a number field k, the abelian group X(k) is finitely generated. Computer algebra programs can determine the Mordell–Weil group X(k) in many examples, but it is not known whether there is an algorithm that always succeeds in computing this group. That would follow from the conjecture that the Tate–Shafarevich group is finite, or from the related Birch–Swinnerton-Dyer conjecture.

=== Genus at least 2 ===
Faltings' theorem (formerly the Mordell conjecture) says that for any curve X of genus at least 2 over a number field k, the set X(k) is finite.

Some of the great achievements of number theory amount to determining the rational points on particular curves. For example, Fermat's Last Theorem (proved by Richard Taylor and Andrew Wiles) is equivalent to the statement that for an integer n at least 3, the only rational points of the curve $x^n+y^n=z^n$ in $\mathbb P^2$ over $\Q$ are the obvious ones: [0,1,1] and [1,0,1]; [0,1,−1] and [1,0,−1] for n even; and [1,−1,0] for n odd. The curve X (like any smooth curve of degree n in $\mathbb P^2$) has genus $\tfrac{(n-1)(n-2)}{2}.$

It is not known whether there is an algorithm to find all the rational points on an arbitrary curve of genus at least 2 over a number field. There is an algorithm that works in some cases. Its termination in general would follow from the conjectures that the Tate–Shafarevich group of an abelian variety over a number field is finite and that the Brauer–Manin obstruction is the only obstruction to the Hasse principle, in the case of curves.

== Higher dimensions ==
=== Varieties with few rational points ===
In higher dimensions, one unifying goal is the Bombieri–Lang conjecture that, for any variety X of general type over a number field k, the set of k-rational points of X is not Zariski dense in X. (That is, the k-rational points are contained in a finite union of lower-dimensional subvarieties of X.) In dimension 1, this is exactly Faltings' theorem, since a curve is of general type if and only if it has genus at least 2. Lang also made finer conjectures relating finiteness of rational points to Kobayashi hyperbolicity.

For example, the Bombieri–Lang conjecture predicts that a smooth hypersurface of degree d in projective space $\mathbb P^n$ over a number field does not have Zariski dense rational points if d ≥ n + 2. Not much is known about that case. The strongest known result on the Bombieri–Lang conjecture is Faltings' theorem on subvarieties of abelian varieties (generalizing the case of curves). Namely, if X is a subvariety of an abelian variety A over a number field k, then all k-rational points of X are contained in a finite union of translates of abelian subvarieties contained in X. (So if X contains no translated abelian subvarieties of positive dimension, then X(k) is finite.)

=== Varieties with many rational points ===
In the opposite direction, a variety X over a number field k is said to have potentially dense rational points if there is a finite extension field E of k such that the E-rational points of X are Zariski dense in X. Frédéric Campana conjectured that a variety is potentially dense if and only if it has no rational fibration over a positive-dimensional orbifold of general type. A known case is that every cubic surface in $\mathbb P^3$ over a number field k has potentially dense rational points, because (more strongly) it becomes rational over some finite extension of k (unless it is the cone over a plane cubic curve). Campana's conjecture would also imply that a K3 surface X (such as a smooth quartic surface in $\mathbb P^3$) over a number field has potentially dense rational points. That is known only in special cases, for example if X has an elliptic fibration.

One may ask when a variety has a rational point without extending the base field. In the case of a hypersurface X of degree d in $\mathbb P^n$ over a number field, there are good results when d is much smaller than n, often based on the Hardy–Littlewood circle method. For example, the Hasse–Minkowski theorem says that the Hasse principle holds for quadric hypersurfaces over a number field (the case d = 2). Christopher Hooley proved the Hasse principle for smooth cubic hypersurfaces in $\mathbb P^n$ over $\Q$ when n ≥ 8. In higher dimensions, even more is true: every smooth cubic in $\mathbb P^n$ over $\Q$ has a rational point when n ≥ 9, by Roger Heath-Brown. More generally, Birch's theorem says that for any odd positive integer d, there is an integer N such that for all n ≥ N, every hypersurface of degree d in $\mathbb P^n$ over $\Q$ has a rational point.

For hypersurfaces of smaller dimension (in terms of their degree), things can be more complicated. For example, the Hasse principle fails for the smooth cubic surface $5x^3 + 9y^3 + 10z^3 + 12w^3 = 0$ in $\mathbb P^3$ over $\Q,$ by Ian Cassels and Richard Guy. Jean-Louis Colliot-Thélène has conjectured that the Brauer–Manin obstruction is the only obstruction to the Hasse principle for cubic surfaces. More generally, that should hold for every rationally connected variety over a number field.

In some cases, it is known that X has "many" rational points whenever it has one. For example, extending work of Beniamino Segre and Yuri Manin, János Kollár showed: for a cubic hypersurface X of dimension at least 2 over a perfect field k with X not a cone, X is unirational over k if it has a k-rational point. (In particular, for k infinite, unirationality implies that the set of k-rational points is Zariski dense in X.) The Manin conjecture is a more precise statement that would describe the asymptotics of the number of rational points of bounded height on a Fano variety.

== Counting points over finite fields ==
A variety X over a finite field k has only finitely many k-rational points. The Weil conjectures, proved by André Weil in dimension 1 and by Pierre Deligne in any dimension, give strong estimates for the number of k-points in terms of the Betti numbers of X. For example, if X is a smooth projective curve of genus g over a field k of order q (a prime power), then

$$\big| |X(k)|-(q+1)\big| \leq 2g\sqrt{q}.$$

For a smooth hypersurface X of degree d in $\mathbb P^n$ over a field k of order q, Deligne's theorem gives the bound:

$$\big| |X(k)|-(q^{n-1}+\cdots+q+1)\big| \leq \bigg( \frac{(d-1)^{n+1}+(-1)^{n+1}(d-1)}{d}\bigg) q^{(n-1)/2}.$$

There are also significant results about when a projective variety over a finite field k has at least one k-rational point. For example, the Chevalley–Warning theorem implies that any hypersurface X of degree d in $\mathbb P^n$ over a finite field k has a k-rational point if d ≤ n. For smooth X, this also follows from Hélène Esnault's theorem that every smooth projective rationally chain connected variety, for example every Fano variety, over a finite field k has a k-rational point.

== See also ==
- Arithmetic dynamics
- Birational geometry
- Functor represented by a scheme
