= Brauer group =

Abelian group related to division algebras

In mathematics, the Brauer group of a field $K$ is an abelian group whose elements are Morita equivalence classes of central simple algebras over $K$, with addition given by the tensor product of algebras. It was defined by the algebraist Richard Brauer.

The Brauer group arose out of attempts to classify division algebras over a field. It can also be defined in terms of Galois cohomology. More generally, the Brauer group of a scheme is defined in terms of Azumaya algebras, or equivalently using projective bundles.

== Construction ==
A central simple algebra (CSA) over a field $K$ is a finite-dimensional associative $K$-algebra $A$ such that $A$ is a simple ring and the center of $A$ is equal to $K$. Note that CSAs are in general not division algebras, though CSAs can be used to classify division algebras.

For example, the complex numbers $\C$ form a CSA over themselves, but not over $\R$ (the center is $\C$ itself, hence too large to be CSA over $\R$). The finite-dimensional division algebras with center $\R$ (that means the dimension over $\R$ is finite) are the real numbers and the quaternions by a theorem of Frobenius, while any matrix ring over the reals or quaternions – $M(n,\R)$ or $M(n,\mathbb{H})$ – is a CSA over the reals, but not a division algebra (if $n>1$).

We obtain an equivalence relation on CSAs over $K$ by the Artin–Wedderburn theorem (Wedderburn's part, in fact), to express any CSA as a matrix ring $M(n,D)$ for some division algebra $D$. If we look just at $D$, that is, if we impose an equivalence relation identifying $M(m,D)$ with $M(n,D)$ for all positive integers $m$ and $n$, we get the Brauer equivalence relation on CSAs over $K$. The elements of the Brauer group are the Brauer equivalence classes of CSAs over $K$.

Given central simple algebras $A$ and $B$, one can look at their tensor product $A\otimes B$ as a $K$-algebra. It turns out that this is always central simple. A slick way to see this is to use a characterization: a central simple algebra $A$ over $K$ is a $K$-algebra that becomes a matrix ring when we extend the field of scalars to an algebraic closure of $K$. This result also shows that the dimension of a central simple algebra $A$ as a $K$-vector space is always a square number. The degree of $A$ is defined to be the square root of its dimension.

As a result, the isomorphism classes of CSAs over $K$ form a monoid under tensor product, compatible with Brauer equivalence, and the Brauer classes are all invertible: the inverse of an algebra $A$ is given by its opposite algebra $A^{\mathrm{op}}$ (the opposite ring with the same action by $K$ since the image of $K\to A$ is in the center of $A$). Explicitly, for a CSA $A$ we have $A\otimes A^{\mathrm{op}}=M(n^2,K)$, where $n$ is the degree of $A$ over $K$.

The Brauer group of any field is a torsion group. In more detail, define the period of a central simple algebra $A$ over $K$ to be its order as an element of the Brauer group. Define the index of $A$ to be the degree of the division algebra that is Brauer equivalent to $A$. Then the period of $A$ divides the index of $A$ (and hence is finite).

== Examples ==
In the following cases, every finite-dimensional central division algebra over a field $K$ is $K$ itself, so that the Brauer group $\operatorname{Br} K$ is trivial:

- $K$ is an algebraically closed field.
- $K$ is a finite field (Wedderburn's theorem). Equivalently, every finite division ring is commutative.
- $K$ is the function field of an algebraic curve over an algebraically closed field (Tsen's theorem). More generally, the Brauer group vanishes for any quasi-algebraically closed field.
- $K$ is an algebraic extension of $\Q$ containing all roots of unity.

The Brauer group $\operatorname{Br}\R$ of the real numbers is the cyclic group of order two. There are just two non-isomorphic real division algebras with center $\R$: $\R$ itself and the quaternion algebra $\mathbb{H}$. Since $\mathbb{H}\otimes\mathbb{H}\cong M(4,\R)$, the class of $\mathbb{H}$ has order two in the Brauer group.

Let $K$ be a non-Archimedean local field, meaning that $K$ is complete under a discrete valuation with finite residue field. Then $\operatorname{Br}K$ is isomorphic to $\Q/\Z$.

== Severi–Brauer varieties ==
Another important interpretation of the Brauer group of a field $K$ is that it classifies the projective varieties over $K$ that become isomorphic to projective space over an algebraic closure of $K$. Such a variety is called a Severi–Brauer variety, and there is a one-to-one correspondence between the isomorphism classes of Severi–Brauer varieties of dimension $n-1$ over $K$ and the central simple algebras of degree $n$ over $K$.

For example, the Severi–Brauer varieties of dimension 1 are exactly the smooth conics in the projective plane over $K$. For a field $K$ of characteristic not 2, every conic over $K$ is isomorphic to one of the form $ax^2+by^2=z^2$ for some nonzero elements $a$ and $b$ of $K$. The corresponding central simple algebra is the quaternion algebra
$$(a,b) = K\langle i,j\rangle/(i^2=a, j^2=b, ij=-ji).$$
The conic is isomorphic to the projective line $\mathbb{P}^1(K)$ if and only if the corresponding quaternion algebra is isomorphic to the matrix algebra $M(2,K)$.

== Cyclic algebras ==
For a positive integer $n$, let $K$ be a field in which $n$ is invertible such that $K$ contains a primitive $n$th root of unity $\zeta$. For nonzero elements $a$ and $b$ of $K$, the associated cyclic algebra is the central simple algebra of degree $n$ over $K$ defined by
$$(a,b)_{\zeta} = K\langle u,v\rangle/(u^n=a, v^n=b, uv=\zeta vu).$$
Cyclic algebras are the best-understood central simple algebras. (When $n$ is not invertible in $K$ or $K$ does not have a primitive $n$th root of unity, a similar construction gives the cyclic algebra $(\chi,a)$ associated to a cyclic $\Z/n$-extension $\chi$ of $K$ and a nonzero element $a$ of $K$.)

The Merkurjev–Suslin theorem in algebraic K-theory has a strong consequence about the Brauer group. Namely, for a positive integer $n$, let $K$ be a field in which $n$ is invertible such that $K$ contains a primitive $n$th root of unity. Then the subgroup of the Brauer group of $K$ killed by $n$ is generated by cyclic algebras of degree $n$. Equivalently, any division algebra of period dividing $n$ is Brauer equivalent to a tensor product of cyclic algebras of degree $n$. Even for a prime number $p$, there are examples showing that a division algebra of period $p$ need not be actually isomorphic to a tensor product of cyclic algebras of degree $p$.

It is a major open problem (raised by Albert) whether every division algebra of prime degree over a field is cyclic. This is true if the degree is 2 or 3, but the problem is wide open for primes at least 5. The known results are only for special classes of fields. For example, if $K$ is a global field or local field, then a division algebra of any degree over $K$ is cyclic, by Albert–Brauer–Hasse–Noether. A "higher-dimensional" result in the same direction was proved by Saltman: if $K$ is a field of transcendence degree 1 over the local field $\Q_p$, then every division algebra of prime degree $\ell\ne p$ over $K$ is cyclic.

== The period-index problem ==
For any central simple algebra $A$ over a field $K$, the period of $A$ divides the index of $A$, and the two numbers have the same prime factors. The period-index problem is to bound the index in terms of the period, for fields $K$ of interest. For example, if $A$ is a central simple algebra over a local field or global field, then Albert–Brauer–Hasse–Noether showed that the index of $A$ is equal to the period of $A$.

For a central simple algebra $A$ over a field $K$ of transcendence degree $n$ over an algebraically closed field, it is conjectured that $\operatorname{ind}(A)$ divides $\operatorname{per}(A)^{n-1}$. This is true for $n\le 2$, the case $n=2$ being an important advance by de Jong, sharpened in positive characteristic by de Jong–Starr and Lieblich.

== Class field theory ==
The Brauer group plays an important role in the modern formulation of class field theory. If $K_v$ is a non-Archimedean local field, local class field theory gives a canonical isomorphism $\operatorname{inv}_v:\operatorname{Br}K_v\to\Q/\Z$, the Hasse invariant.

The case of a global field $K$ (such as a number field) is addressed by global class field theory. If $D$ is a central simple algebra over $K$ and $v$ is a place of $K$, then $D\otimes K_v$ is a central simple algebra over $K_v$, the completion of $K$ at $v$. This defines a homomorphism from the Brauer group of $K$ into the Brauer group of $K_v$. A given central simple algebra $D$ splits for all but finitely many $v$, so that the image of $D$ under almost all such homomorphisms is 0. The Brauer group $\operatorname{Br}K$ fits into an exact sequence constructed by Hasse:
$$0 \rightarrow \operatorname{Br}K \rightarrow \bigoplus_{v \in S} \operatorname{Br}K_v \rightarrow \Q/\Z \rightarrow 0,$$
where $S$ is the set of all places of $K$ and the right arrow is the sum of the local invariants; the Brauer group of the real numbers is identified with $\Z/2\Z$. The injectivity of the left arrow is the content of the Albert–Brauer–Hasse–Noether theorem.

The fact that the sum of all local invariants of a central simple algebra over $K$ is zero is a typical reciprocity law. For example, applying this to a quaternion algebra $(a,b)$ over $\Q$ gives the quadratic reciprocity law.

== Galois cohomology ==
For an arbitrary field $K$, the Brauer group can be expressed in terms of Galois cohomology as follows:
$$\operatorname{Br}K \cong H^2(K, G_\text{m}),$$
where $G_m$ denotes the multiplicative group, viewed as an algebraic group over $K$. More concretely, the cohomology group indicated means $H^2(\operatorname{Gal}(K_s/K),K_s^*)$, where $K_s$ denotes a separable closure of K.

The isomorphism of the Brauer group with a Galois cohomology group can be described as follows. The automorphism group of the algebra of $n\times n$ matrices is the projective linear group $\operatorname{PGL}(n)$. Since all central simple algebras over $K$ become isomorphic to the matrix algebra over a separable closure of $K$, the set of isomorphism classes of central simple algebras of degree $n$ over $K$ can be identified with the Galois cohomology set $H^1(K,\operatorname{PGL}(K))$. The class of a central simple algebra in $H^2(K,G_m)$ is the image of its class in $H^1$ under the boundary homomorphism
$$H^1(K, \operatorname{PGL}(n)) \rightarrow H^2(K, G_\text{m})$$
associated to the short exact sequence $1\to G_m\to\operatorname{GL}(n)\to\operatorname{PGL}(n)\to 1$.

== The Brauer group of a scheme ==
The Brauer group was generalized from fields to commutative rings by Auslander and Goldman. Grothendieck went further by defining the Brauer group of any scheme.

There are two ways of defining the Brauer group of a scheme $X$, using either Azumaya algebras over $X$ or projective bundles over $X$. The second definition involves projective bundles that are locally trivial in the étale topology, not necessarily in the Zariski topology. In particular, a projective bundle is defined to be zero in the Brauer group if and only if it is the projectivization of some vector bundle.

The cohomological Brauer group of a quasi-compact scheme $X$ is defined to be the torsion subgroup of the étale cohomology group $H^2(X,G_m)$. (The whole group $H^2(X,G_m)$ need not be torsion, although it is torsion for regular, integral, quasi-compact schemes $X$.) The Brauer group is always a subgroup of the cohomological Brauer group. Gabber showed that the Brauer group is equal to the cohomological Brauer group for any scheme with an ample line bundle (for example, any quasi-projective scheme over a commutative ring).

The whole group $H^2(X,G_m)$ can be viewed as classifying the gerbes over $X$ with structure group $G_m$.

For smooth projective varieties over a field, the Brauer group is an important birational invariant. For example, when $X$ is also rationally connected over the complex numbers, the Brauer group of $X$ is isomorphic to the torsion subgroup of the singular cohomology group $H^3(X,\Z)$, which is therefore a birational invariant. Artin and Mumford used this description of the Brauer group to give the first example of a unirational variety $X$ over $\C$ that is not stably rational (that is, no product of $X$ with a projective space is rational).

== Relation to the Tate conjecture ==
Artin conjectured that every proper scheme over the integers has finite Brauer group. This is far from known even in the special case of a smooth projective variety $X$ over a finite field. Indeed, the finiteness of the Brauer group for surfaces in that case is equivalent to the Tate conjecture for divisors on $X$, one of the main problems in the theory of algebraic cycles.

For a regular integral scheme of dimension 2 which is flat and proper over the ring of integers of a number field, and which has a section, the finiteness of the Brauer group is equivalent to the finiteness of the Tate–Shafarevich group Ш for the Jacobian variety of the general fiber (a curve over a number field). The finiteness of Ш is a central problem in the arithmetic of elliptic curves and more generally abelian varieties.

== The Brauer–Manin obstruction ==
Let $X$ be a smooth projective variety over a number field $K$. The Hasse principle would predict that if $X$ has a rational point over all completions $K_v$ of $K$, then $X$ has a $K$-rational point. The Hasse principle holds for some special classes of varieties, but not in general. Manin used the Brauer group of $X$ to define the Brauer–Manin obstruction, which can be applied in many cases to show that $X$ has no $K$-points even when $X$ has points over all completions of $K$.
