= Alexei Skorobogatov =

British-Russian mathematician

- Born: 4 November 1961 (age 64); Moscow, USSR
- Education: Moscow State University
- Awards: Whitehead Prize (2001)
- Scientific career
- Fields: Mathematics
- Workplaces: Imperial College London
- Doctoral advisor: Yuri Manin

Alexei Nikolaievich Skorobogatov (Russian: Алексе́й Никола́евич Скоробога́тов) is a British-Russian mathematician and Professor in Pure Mathematics at Imperial College London specialising in algebraic geometry. His work has focused on rational points, the Hasse principle, the Manin obstruction, exponential sums, and error-correcting codes.

== Education ==
He completed his dissertation under the supervision of Yuri Manin, for which he was awarded a Ph.D. degree.

== Awards ==
In 2001 he was awarded a Whitehead Prize by the London Mathematical Society.

He was elected as a Fellow of the American Mathematical Society in the 2020 Class, for "contributions to the Diophantine geometry of surfaces and higher dimensional varieties".

== Books ==
- Alexei Skorobogatov (2001). Torsors and Rational Points. Cambridge University Press. ISBN 978-0-521-80237-6.
- Alexei Skorobogatov; Miles Reid (2004). Number Theory and Algebraic Geometry. Cambridge University Press. ISBN 978-0-521-54518-1.
- Jean-Louis Colliot-Thélène; Alexei N. Skorobogatov (2021). The Brauer–Grothendieck Group. Springer Cham. ISBN 978-3-030-74247-8.
