= Factor system =

In mathematics, a factor system (sometimes called factor set) is a fundamental tool of Otto Schreier’s classical theory for group extension problem. It consists of a set of automorphisms and a binary function on a group satisfying certain condition (so-called cocycle condition). In fact, a factor system constitutes a realisation of the cocycles in the second cohomology group in group cohomology.

== Introduction ==
Suppose G is a group and A is an abelian group. For a group extension

$$1 \to A \to X \to G \to 1,$$

there exists a factor system which consists of a function f : G × G → A and homomorphism σ: G → Aut(A) such that it makes the cartesian product G × A a group X as

$$(g,a)*(h,b) := (gh, f(g,h)a^{\sigma(h)}b).$$

So f must be a "group 2-cocycle" (and thus define an element in H^{2}(G, A), as studied in group cohomology). In fact, A does not have to be abelian, but the situation is more complicated for non-abelian groups

If f is trivial, then X splits over A, so that X is the semidirect product of G with A.

If a group algebra is given, then a factor system f modifies that algebra to a skew-group algebra by modifying the group operation xy to f (x, y) xy.

== Application: for Abelian field extensions ==
Let G be a group and L a field on which G acts as automorphisms. A cocycle or (Noether) factor system is a map c: G × G → L^{*} satisfying

$$c(h,k)^g c(hk,g) = c(h,kg) c(k,g) .$$

Cocycles are equivalent if there exists some system of elements a : G → L^{*} with

$$c'(g,h) = c(g,h) (a_g^h a_h a_{gh}^{-1}) .$$

Cocycles of the form

$$c(g,h) = a_g^h a_h a_{gh}^{-1}$$

are called split. Cocycles under multiplication modulo split cocycles form a group, the second cohomology group H^{2}(G,L^{*}).

=== Crossed product algebras ===
Let us take the case that G is the Galois group of a field extension L/K. A factor system c in H^{2}(G,L^{*}) gives rise to a crossed product algebra A, which is a K-algebra containing L as a subfield, generated by the elements λ in L and u_{g} with multiplication

$$\lambda u_g = u_g \lambda^g ,$$
$$u_g u_h = u_{gh} c(g,h) .$$

Equivalent factor systems correspond to a change of basis in A over K. We may write

$$A = (L,G,c) .$$

The crossed product algebra A is a central simple algebra (CSA) of degree equal to [L : K]. The converse holds: every central simple algebra over K that splits over L and such that deg A = [L : K] arises in this way. The tensor product of algebras corresponds to multiplication of the corresponding elements in H^{2}. We thus obtain an identification of the Brauer group, where the elements are classes of CSAs over K, with H^{2}.

=== Cyclic algebra ===
Let us further restrict to the case that L/K is cyclic with Galois group G of order n generated by t. Let A be a crossed product (L,G,c) with factor set c. Let u = u_{t} be the generator in A corresponding to t. We can define the other generators

$$u_{t^i} = u^i \,$$

and then we have u^{n} = a in K. This element a specifies a cocycle c by

$$c(t^i,t^j) = \begin{cases} 1 & \text{if } i+j < n, \\ a & \text{if } i+j \ge n. \end{cases}$$

It thus makes sense to denote A simply by (L,t,a). However a is not uniquely specified by A since we can multiply u by any element λ of L^{*} and then a is multiplied by the product of the conjugates of λ. Hence A corresponds to an element of the norm residue group K^{*}/N_{L/K}L^{*}. We obtain the isomorphisms

$$\operatorname{Br}(L/K) \equiv K^*/N_{L/K} L^* \equiv H^2(G,L^*) .$$
