= François Châtelet (mathematician) =

French mathematician

François Châtelet (11 September 1912 – 19 April 1987, age 75) was a mathematician at the Université de Besançon who introduced the Weil–Châtelet group and Châtelet surfaces. His father was the mathematician Albert Châtelet.
