= Hà Huy Khoái =

Vietnamese mathematician (born 1946)

Hà Huy Khoái (born 24 November 1946, in Ha Tinh) is a Vietnamese mathematician working in complex analysis.

== Career ==
Hà Huy Khoái studied in Vietnam under the "fathers" of Vietnamese mathematics Lê Văn Thiêm and Hoàng Tụy, and in Moscow at the Steklov Institute of Mathematics under Yuri I. Manin. He is currently a professor and the director of the Mathematics Institute of Vietnam Academy of Science and Technology. He is a senior advisor of the Acta Mathematica Vietnamica journal.

His main field of work has been p-adic Nevanlinna theory, for example proving part of a non-Archimedean version of Green's theorem (AMS, 1992, 503-509).

== International Mathematical Olympiads ==
He has been the Vietnam team leader for several International Mathematical Olympiads.

== Selected publications ==
- Holomorphic mappings on Banach analytic manifolds, in Func. Analyz i ego Priloz., 4 (1973), no.4 (with Nguyen Van Khue).
- Sur une conjecture de Mazur et Swinnerton-Dyer, C. R. Acad. Sci. Paris, 289(1979), 483-485.
- On p-adic interpolation, in Mat. Zametki, 26 (1979), no.1 (in Russian), AMS translation in Mathematical Notes, 26 (1980), 541-549.
- On p-adic L-functions associated to elliptic curves, in Mat. Zametki, 26 (1979), no.2 (in Russian), AMS translation: Math. Notes, 26 (1980), 629-634.
- p-adic Interpolation and the Mellin-Mazur transform, Acta Mathematica, Vietnam., 5 (1980), no.1, 77-99.
- On p-adic meromorphic functions, Duke Mathematical Journal, 50 (1983), 695-711.
- p-adic Interpolation and continuation of p-adic functions, Lecture Notes in Math, 1013 (1983), 252-265.
- p-adic Nevanlinna Theory, Lecture Notes in Math., 1351, 138-152 (with My Vinh Quang).
- La hauteur des fonctions holomorphes p-adiques de plusieurs variables, C. R. Acad. Sci. Paris, 312 (1991), 751-754.
- La hauteur d’une suite de points dans Ck p et l’interpolation des fonctions holomorphes de plusieurs variables, C. R. Acad. Sci. Paris, 312 (1991), 903-905.
- Sur les series L associees aux formes modulaires, Bull. Soc. math. France, 120 (1992), 1-13.
- Finite codimensional subalgebras of Stein algebras and semiglobally Stein algebras, Transactions of the American Mathematical Society, (1992), 503-509 (with Nguyen Van Khue).
- P-adic Nevanlinna-Cartan Theorem, Internat. J. Math, 6 (1995), no.5, 710-731 (with Mai Van Tu).
- p-adic Hyperbolic surfaces, Acta Math. Vietnam., (1997), no.2, 99-112.
- Hyperbolic surfaces in P3(C), Proc. Amer. Math. Soc., 125 (1997), 3527-3532.
- On uniqueness polynomials and bi-URS for p-adic meromorphic functions, J. Number Theory, 87(2001), 211-221 (with Ta Thi Hoai An) .
- Value Distribution for p-adic hypersurfaces, Taiwanese J. Math., 7 (2003), no.1, 51-67 (with Vu Hoai An).
- On the functional equation P(f) = Q(g), Adv. Complex Anal. Appl., 3, Kluwer Acad. Publ., Boston, MA, 2004, 201-207 (with C.-C., Yang).
- Some remarks on the genericity of unique range sets for meromorphic functions, Sci. China Ser. A, 48(2005), 262-267.
- p-Adic Fatou-Bieberbach mappings, Inter. J. Math, 16 (2005), No.3.
- Unique range sets and decomposition of meromorphic functions, Contemporary Math., 475 (2008), 95-105.
- Value distribution problem for p-adic meromorphic functions and their derivatives, Ann. Fac. Sci.Toulouse., XX (2011), 135-149 (with Vu Hoai An).
