= Châtelet surface =

Algebraic surface

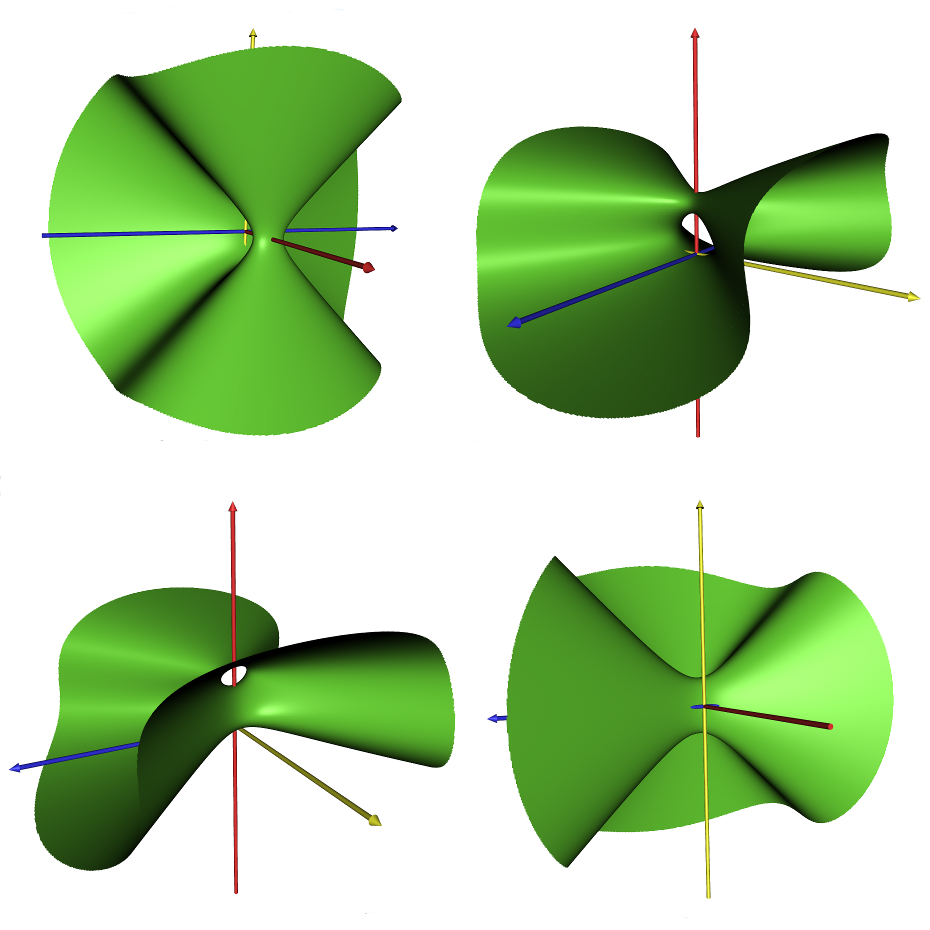
Some snapshots showing the real points of the Châtelet surface with P(x) = x^{3} – 5x^{2} – 6x. Axes: x = red, y = yellow, z = blue

In algebraic geometry, a Châtelet surface is a rational surface studied by Châtelet (1959) given by an equation

$$y^2-az^2=P(x), \,$$

where P has degree 3 or 4. They are conic bundles.
