= Wilhelm Grunwald =

German mathematician (1909–1989)

Wilhelm Grunwald (15 July 1909 – 7 June 1989) was a German mathematician who introduced the Grunwald–Wang theorem, though his original statement and proof of this contained a small error that was corrected by Shianghao Wang. He later left mathematics to become a science librarian, and was director of the Göttingen university library (Roquette 2005, p.29).
