= Hasse invariant of a quadratic form =

In mathematics, the Hasse invariant (or Hasse–Witt invariant) of a quadratic form Q over a field K takes values in the Brauer group Br(K). The name "Hasse–Witt" comes from Helmut Hasse and Ernst Witt.

The quadratic form Q may be taken as a diagonal form

Σ a_{i}x_{i}^{2}.

Its invariant is then defined as the product of the classes in the Brauer group of all the quaternion algebras

(a_{i}, a_{j}) for i < j.

This is independent of the diagonal form chosen to compute it.

It may also be viewed as the second Stiefel–Whitney class of Q.

== Symbols ==
The invariant may be computed for a specific symbol φ taking values in the group C_{2} = {±1}.

In the context of quadratic forms over a local field, the Hasse invariant may be defined using the Hilbert symbol, the unique symbol taking values in C_{2}. The invariants of a quadratic forms over a local field are precisely the dimension, discriminant and Hasse invariant.

For quadratic forms over a number field, there is a Hasse invariant ±1 for every finite place. The invariants of a form over a number field are precisely the dimension, discriminant, all local Hasse invariants and the signatures coming from real embeddings.

== See also ==
- Hasse–Minkowski theorem
