= Mariusz Wodzicki =

Polish mathematician (born 1956)

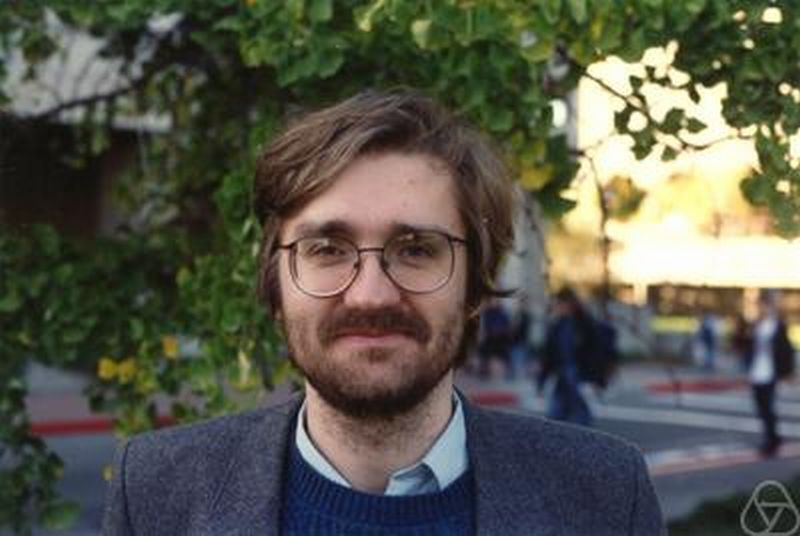
- Wodzicki, Berkeley, 1993
- Born: 1956 (age 69–70); Bytom, Poland
- Citizenship: Poland
- Education: Moscow State University
- Known for: algebraic k-theory; noncommutative geometry; algebraic geometry
- Scientific career
- Fields: Mathematician
- Workplaces: University of Oxford; Polish Academy of Sciences; University of California, Berkeley

Mariusz Wodzicki (Polish: [ˈmarjuʂ vɔˈd͡ʑit͡skʲi]; born 1956) is a Polish mathematician and professor of mathematics at the University of California, Berkeley, whose works primarily focus on analysis, algebraic K-theory, noncommutative geometry, and algebraic geometry.

== Life and career ==
Wodzicki was born in Bytom, Poland in 1956. He received a MSc from Moscow State University in 1980, and he completed his doctoral degree in 1984 at the Steklov Institute of Mathematics in Moscow under the advisement of Yuri Manin (Spectral Asymmetry and Zeta-Functions).

In 1985–1986 he was a research assistant at the Mathematical Institute, University of Oxford, after which he became an assistant professor at the Mathematical Institute of the Polish Academy of Sciences. He is currently a professor of mathematics at the University of California, Berkeley.

In 1992, Wodzicki was an invited speaker of the European Congress of Mathematics in Paris (Algebraic K-theory and functional analysis). In 1994, he was an invited speaker of the International Congress of Mathematicians in Zürich (The algebra of functional analysis).

== Selection of writings ==
- Dykema, Ken; Figiel, Tadeusz; Weiss, Gary; Wodzicki, Mariusz (2004). "Commutator structure of operator ideals". Advances in Mathematics. 185 (1): 1–79. doi:10.1016/S0001-8708(03)00141-5.
- Vestigia investiganda. Moscow Mathematical Journal, vol 2, 2002, pp. 769–798, 806.
- with Ken Dykema, Gary Weiss: Unitarily invariant trace extensions beyond the trace class. In: Complex analysis and related topics (Cuernavaca, 1996) Oper. Theory Adv. Appl. vol. 114, 2000, pp. 59–65
- Algebraic K-theory and functional analysis, ECM Paris 1992, Birkhäuser, Progress in Mathematics, 1994
- Suslin, Andrei A.; Wodzicki, Mariusz (1992). "Excision in algebraic K-theory". Annals of Mathematics. 136 (1): 51–122. doi:10.2307/2946546. JSTOR 2946546. MR 1173926. Zbl 0756.18008.
- Wodzicki, Mariusz (1989). "Excision in cyclic homology and in rational algebraic K-theory". Annals of Mathematics. 129 (3): 591–639. doi:10.2307/1971518. JSTOR 1971518. MR 0997314. Zbl 0689.16013.

== See also ==
- List of Polish mathematicians
