= Simple algebra (universal algebra) =

In universal algebra, an abstract algebra A is called simple if and only if it has no nontrivial congruence relations, or equivalently, if every homomorphism with domain A is either injective or constant.

As congruences on rings are characterized by their ideals, this notion is a straightforward generalization of the notion from ring theory: a ring is simple in the sense that it has no nontrivial ideals if and only if it is simple in the sense of universal algebra. The same remark applies with respect to groups and normal subgroups; hence the universal notion is also a generalization of a simple group (it is a matter of convention whether a one-element algebra should be or should not be considered simple, hence only in this special case the notions might not match).

A theorem by Roberto Magari in 1969 asserts that every variety contains a simple algebra.

== See also ==
- Simple group
- Simple ring
- Central simple algebra
