= Heinrich Martin Weber =

German mathematician

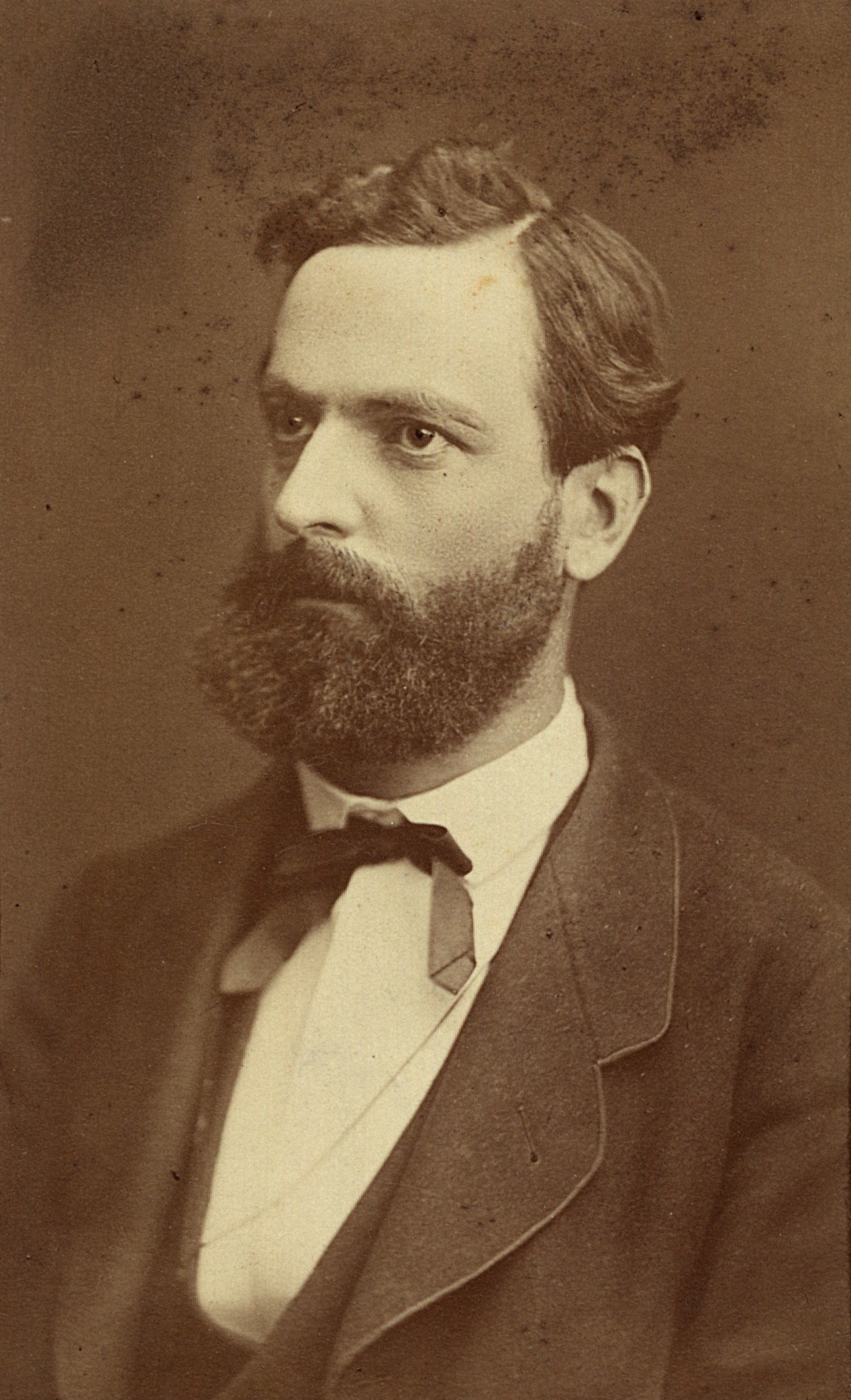
- Born: 5 March 1842; Heidelberg, Germany
- Died: 17 May 1913 (aged 71); Strasbourg, Alsace-Lorraine, German Empire
- Education: University of Erlangen; University of Heidelberg
- Known for: Abstract algebra Class field theory Group theory Number theory Weber functions Weber vector Weber modular function Weber's theorem Kronecker–Weber theorem
- Awards: ICM Speaker (1897)
- Scientific career
- Fields: Mathematics
- Doctoral advisor: Otto Hesse
- Doctoral students: Heinrich Brandt; E. V. Huntington; Louis Karpinski; Friedrich Levi

Heinrich Martin Weber (5 March 1842, Heidelberg, Germany – 17 May 1913, Straßburg, Alsace-Lorraine, German Empire, now Strasbourg, France) was a German mathematician. Weber's main work was in algebra, number theory, and analysis. He is best known for his text Lehrbuch der Algebra published in 1895 and much of it is his original research in algebra and number theory. His work Theorie der algebraischen Functionen einer Veränderlichen (with Dedekind) established an algebraic foundation for Riemann surfaces, allowing a purely algebraic formulation of the Riemann–Roch theorem. Weber's research papers were numerous, most of them appearing in Crelle's Journal or Mathematische Annalen. He was the editor of Riemann's collected works.

Weber was born in Heidelberg, Baden, and entered the University of Heidelberg in 1860. In 1866 he became a privatdozent, and in 1869 he was appointed as extraordinary professor at that school. Weber also taught in Zürich at the Federal Polytechnic Institute (today the ETH Zurich), at the University of Königsberg, and at the Technische Hochschule in Charlottenburg (today Technische Universität Berlin). His final post was at the Kaiser-Wilhelm-Universität Straßburg, Alsace-Lorraine, where he died.

In 1893 in Chicago, his paper Zur Theorie der ganzzahligen algebraischen Gleichungen was read (but not by him) at the International Mathematical Congress held in connection with the World's Columbian Exposition. In 1895 and in 1904 he was president of the Deutsche Mathematiker-Vereinigung. His doctoral students include Heinrich Brandt, E. V. Huntington, Louis Karpinski, and Friedrich Levi.

== Publications ==
- with Richard Dedekind: Theorie der algebraischen Functionen einer Veränderlichen. J. Reine Angew. Math. 92 (1882) 181–290
- Elliptische Functionen und algebraische Zahlen. Braunschweig 1891
- Encyklopädie der Elementar-Mathematik. Ein Handbuch für Lehrer und Studierende. Leipzig 1903/07, (Vol. 1, Vol. 2, Vol. 3) (in German)
- with Bernhard Riemann (i.e. partly based on Riemann's lectures): Die partiellen Differential-Gleichungen der mathematischen Physik. Braunschweig 1900-01
- Lehrbuch der Algebra. Braunschweig 1924, ed. Robert Fricke
- Weber, Heinrich Martin (1981) [1895], Lehrbuch der Algebra (in German), vol. 1 (3rd ed.), New York: AMS Chelsea Publishing, ISBN 978-0-8218-3258-5
- Weber, Heinrich Martin (1981) [1895], Lehrbuch der Algebra (in German), vol. 2 (3rd ed.), New York: AMS Chelsea Publishing, ISBN 978-0-8218-2647-8
- Weber, Heinrich Martin (1981) [1898], Lehrbuch der Algebra (in German), vol. 3 (3rd ed.), New York: AMS Chelsea Publishing, ISBN 978-0-8218-2971-4 The third volume is an expanded version of his earlier book "Elliptische Functionen und algebraische Zahlen".
