= Tate duality =

In mathematics, Tate duality or Poitou–Tate duality is a duality theorem for Galois cohomology groups of modules over the Galois group of an algebraic number field or local field, introduced by John Tate (1962) and Georges Poitou (1967).

== Local Tate duality ==
For a p-adic local field $k$, local Tate duality says there is a perfect pairing of the finite groups arising from Galois cohomology:

$$\displaystyle H^r(k,M)\times H^{2-r}(k,M')\rightarrow H^2(k,\mathbb{G}_m)=\Q/ \Z$$

where $M$ is a finite group scheme, $M'$ its dual $\operatorname{Hom}(M,\mathbb{G}_m)$, and $\mathbb{G}_m$ is the multiplicative group. For a local field of characteristic $p>0$, the statement is similar, except that the pairing takes values in $H^2(k, \mu) = \bigcup_{p \nmid n} \tfrac{1}{n} \Z/\Z$. The statement also holds when $k$ is an Archimedean field, though the definition of the cohomology groups looks somewhat different in this case.

== Global Tate duality ==
Given a finite group scheme $M$ over a global field $k$, global Tate duality relates the cohomology of $M$ with that of $M' = \operatorname{Hom}(M,\mathbb{G}_m)$ using the local pairings constructed above. This is done via the localization maps

$$\alpha_{r, M}: H^r(k, M) \rightarrow {\prod_v}' H^r(k_v, M),$$

where $v$ varies over all places of $k$, and where $\prod'$ denotes a restricted product with respect to the unramified cohomology groups. Summing the local pairings gives a canonical perfect pairing

$${\prod_v}' H^r(k_v, M) \times {\prod_v}' H^{2- r}(k_v, M') \rightarrow \Q/\Z .$$

One part of Poitou-Tate duality states that, under this pairing, the image of $H^r(k, M)$ has annihilator equal to the image of $H^{2-r}(k, M')$ for $r = 0, 1, 2$.

The map $\alpha_{r, M}$ has a finite kernel for all $r$, and Tate also constructs a canonical perfect pairing

$$\text{ker}(\alpha_{1, M}) \times \ker(\alpha_{2, M'}) \rightarrow \Q/\Z .$$

These dualities are often presented in the form of a nine-term exact sequence

$$0 \rightarrow H^0(k, M) \rightarrow {\prod_v}' H^0(k_v, M) \rightarrow  H^2(k, M')^*$$
$$\rightarrow H^1(k, M) \rightarrow {\prod_v}' H^1(k_v, M) \rightarrow H^1(k, M')^*$$
$$\rightarrow H^2(k, M) \rightarrow {\prod_v}' H^2(k_v, M) \rightarrow H^0(k, M')^* \rightarrow 0.$$

Here, the asterisk denotes the Pontryagin dual of a given locally compact abelian group.

All of these statements were presented by Tate in a more general form depending on a set of places $S$ of $k$, with the above statements being the form of his theorems for the case where $S$ contains all places of $k$. For the more general result, see e.g. Neukirch, Schmidt & Wingberg (2000, Theorem 8.4.4).

== Poitou–Tate duality ==
Among other statements, Poitou–Tate duality establishes a perfect pairing between certain Shafarevich groups. Given a global field $k$, a set S of primes, and the maximal extension $k_S$ which is unramified outside S, the Shafarevich groups capture, broadly speaking, those elements in the cohomology of $\operatorname{Gal}(k_S/k)$ which vanish in the Galois cohomology of the local fields pertaining to the primes in S.

An extension to the case where the ring of S-integers $\mathcal{O}_S$ is replaced by a regular scheme of finite type over $\operatorname{Spec} \mathcal{O}_S$ was shown by Geisser & Schmidt (2018). Another generalisation is due to Česnavičius, who relaxed the condition on the localising set S by using flat cohomology on smooth proper curves.

== See also ==
- Artin–Verdier duality
- Tate pairing
