= Severi–Brauer variety =

In mathematics, a Severi–Brauer variety over a field K is an algebraic variety V which becomes isomorphic to a projective space over an algebraic closure of K. The varieties are associated to central simple algebras in such a way that the algebra splits over K if and only if the variety has a rational point over K. Francesco Severi (1932) studied these varieties, and they are also named after Richard Brauer because of their close relation to the Brauer group.

In dimension one, the Severi–Brauer varieties are conics. The corresponding central simple algebras are the quaternion algebras. The quaternion algebra (a, b)_{K}, with generators $i,j$ and relations $i^2=a, j^2=b$ and $ij = -ji$, corresponds to the conic C(a, b) with equation

$$z^2 = ax^2 + by^2$$

and the algebra (a, b)_{K} splits, that is, (a, b)_{K} is isomorphic to a matrix algebra over K, if and only if C(a, b) has a point defined over K: this is in turn equivalent to C(a, b) being isomorphic to the projective line over K.

Such varieties are of interest not only in diophantine geometry, but also in Galois cohomology. They represent (at least if K is a perfect field) Galois cohomology classes in H^{1}(G(K^{s}/K),PGL_{n}), where PGL_{n} is the projective linear group, and n is one more than the dimension of the variety V. As usual in Galois cohomology, we often leave the $G(K^s/K)$ implied. There is a short exact sequence

1 → GL_{1} → GL_{n} → PGL_{n} → 1

of algebraic groups. This implies a connecting homomorphism

H^{1}(PGL_{n}) → H^{2}(GL_{1})

at the level of cohomology. Here H^{2}(GL_{1}) is identified with the Brauer group of K, while the kernel is trivial because H^{1}(GL_{n}) = {1} by an extension of Hilbert's Theorem 90. Therefore, Severi–Brauer varieties can be faithfully represented by Brauer group elements, i.e. classes of central simple algebras.

Lichtenbaum showed that if X is a Severi–Brauer variety over K then there is an exact sequence

$$0 \rightarrow \mathrm{Pic}(X) \rightarrow \mathbb{Z} ~\stackrel{\delta}{\rightarrow}~ \mathrm{Br}(K) \rightarrow \mathrm{Br}(K)/(X) \rightarrow 0 \ .$$

Here the map δ sends 1 to the Brauer class corresponding to X.

As a consequence, we see that if the class of X has order d in the Brauer group then there is a divisor class of degree d on X. The associated linear system defines the d-dimensional embedding of X over a splitting field L.

== See also ==
- Projective bundle
