= Manin conjecture =

Unsolved problem in number theory

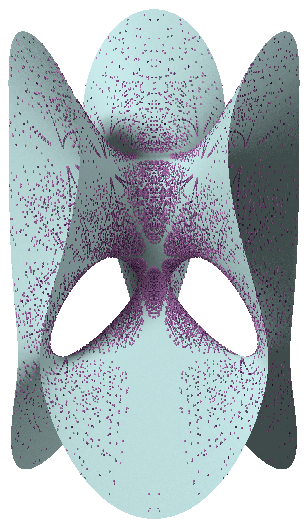
Rational points of bounded height outside the 27 lines on Clebsch's diagonal cubic surface.

In mathematics, the Manin conjecture describes the conjectural distribution of rational points on an algebraic variety relative to a suitable height function. It was proposed by Yuri I. Manin and his collaborators in 1989 when they initiated a program with the aim of describing the distribution of rational points on suitable algebraic varieties.

== Conjecture ==
Their main conjecture is as follows. Let $V$ be a Fano variety defined over a number field $K$, let $H$ be a height function relative to the anticanonical divisor and assume that $V(K)$ is Zariski dense in $V$. Then there exists a non-empty Zariski open subset $U \subset V$ such that the counting function of $K$-rational points of bounded height, defined by

$$N_{U,H}(B)=\#\{x \in U(K):H(x)\leq B\}$$

for $B \geq 1$, satisfies

$$N_{U,H}(B) \sim c B (\log B)^{\rho-1},$$

as $B \to \infty.$ Here $\rho$ is the rank of the Picard group of $V$ and $c$ is a positive constant which later received a conjectural interpretation by Peyre.

Manin's conjecture has been proved for special families of varieties, but is still open in general.
