= Wang Xianghao =

Chinese mathematician

Wang Xianghao, Shianghao Wang, or Shianghaw Wang (Chinese: 王湘浩; 5 May 1915 – 4 May 1993) was a Chinese mathematician who introduced the Grunwald–Wang theorem in (Wang 1948, 1950), correcting an error in Wilhelm Grunwald's original statement and proof of this. He later changed from mathematics to computer science and control theory, and became a member of the Chinese Academy of Sciences.(Roquette 2005, p. 30)

Some days later I was with Artin in his office when Wang appeared. He said he had a counterexample to a lemma which had been used in the proof. An hour or two later, he produced a counterexample to the theorem itself... Of course he [Artin] was astonished, as were all of us students, that a famous theorem with two published proofs, one of which we had all heard in the seminar without our noticing anything, could be wrong.

— John Tate, quoted in Roquette (2005, p.30)
