= Subfield of an algebra =

In algebra, a subfield of an algebra A over a field F is an F-subalgebra that is also a field. A maximal subfield is a subfield that is not contained in a strictly larger subfield of A.

If A is a finite-dimensional central simple algebra, then a subfield E of A is called a strictly maximal subfield if $[E : F] = (\dim_F A)^{1/2}$.
