= Yuri Manin =

Russian mathematician (1937–2023)

- Юрий Манин
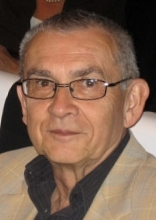
- Manin in 2006
- Born: Yuri Ivanovich Manin; 16 February 1937; Simferopol, Crimean ASSR, Russian SFSR, Soviet Union
- Died: 7 January 2023 (aged 85); Bonn, Germany
- Education: Moscow State University; Steklov Mathematics Institute (PhD)
- Known for: Manin conjecture Manin matrix Manin obstruction Manin triple Manin–Drinfeld theorem Manin–Mumford conjecture ADHM construction Gauss–Manin connection Cartier–Manin operator CH-quasigroup; Modular symbol Quantum simulator
- Awards: Nemmers Prize in Mathematics (1994); Schock Prize (1999); Cantor Medal (2002); Bolyai Prize (2010); King Faisal International Prize (2002)
- Scientific career
- Fields: Mathematics
- Workplaces: Max-Planck-Institut für Mathematik; Northwestern University
- Doctoral advisor: Igor Shafarevich
- Doctoral students: Arend Bayer; Alexander Beilinson; Vladimir Berkovich; Ivan Cherednik; Mariusz Wodzicki; Vladimir Drinfeld; Ha Huy Khoai; Vasilli Iskovskikh; Mikhail Kapranov; Ralph Kaufmann; Victor Kolyvagin; Alexander L. Rosenberg; Vyacheslav Shokurov; Alexei Skorobogatov; Yuri Tschinkel; Boris Tsygan

Yuri Ivanovich Manin (Russian: Ю́рий Ива́нович Ма́нин) (16 February 1937 – 7 January 2023) was a Russian mathematician, known for work in algebraic geometry and diophantine geometry, and many expository works ranging from mathematical logic to theoretical physics.

== Life and career ==
Manin was born on 16 February 1937 in Simferopol, Crimean ASSR, Soviet Union.

He received a doctorate in 1960 at the Steklov Mathematics Institute as a student of Igor Shafarevich. He became a professor at the Max-Planck-Institut für Mathematik in Bonn, where he was director from 1992 to 2005 and then director emeritus. He was also a Trustee Chair Professor at Northwestern University from 2002 to 2011.

He had over the years more than 50 doctoral students, including Vladimir Berkovich, Mariusz Wodzicki, Alexander Beilinson, Ivan Cherednik, Alexei Skorobogatov, Vladimir Drinfeld, Mikhail Kapranov, Vyacheslav Shokurov, Ralph Kaufmann, Victor Kolyvagin, Alexander L. Rosenberg, Alexander A. Voronov, and Hà Huy Khoái.

Manin died on 7 January 2023 in Bonn.

== Research ==
Manin's early work included papers on the arithmetic and formal groups of abelian varieties, the Mordell conjecture in the function field case, and algebraic differential equations. The Gauss–Manin connection is a basic ingredient of the study of cohomology in families of algebraic varieties.

He developed the Manin obstruction, indicating the role of the Brauer group in accounting for obstructions to the Hasse principle via Grothendieck's theory of global Azumaya algebras, setting off a generation of further work.

Manin pioneered the field of arithmetic topology (along with John Tate, David Mumford, Michael Artin, and Barry Mazur). He also formulated the Manin conjecture, which predicts the asymptotic behaviour of the number of rational points of bounded height on algebraic varieties.

In mathematical physics, Manin wrote on Yang–Mills theory, quantum information, and mirror symmetry. He was one of the first to propose the idea of a quantum computer in 1980 with his book Computable and Uncomputable.

He wrote a book on cubic surfaces and cubic forms, showing how to apply both classical and contemporary methods of algebraic geometry, as well as nonassociative algebra.

== Awards ==
He was awarded the Brouwer Medal in 1987, the first Nemmers Prize in Mathematics in 1994, the Schock Prize of the Royal Swedish Academy of Sciences in 1999, the Cantor Medal of the German Mathematical Society in 2002, the King Faisal International Prize in 2002, and the Bolyai Prize of the Hungarian Academy of Sciences in 2010.

In 1990, he became a foreign member of the Royal Netherlands Academy of Arts and Sciences. He was a member of eight other academies of science and was also an honorary member of the London Mathematical Society.

== Selected works ==
- Mathematics as metaphor – selected essays. American Mathematical Society. 2009.
- "Rational points of algebraic curves over function fields". AMS translations 1966 (Mordell conjecture for function fields).
- Manin, Yu I. (1965). "Algebraic topology of algebraic varieties". Russian Mathematical Surveys. 20 (6): 183–192. Bibcode:1965RuMaS..20..183M. doi:10.1070/RM1965v020n06ABEH001192. S2CID 250895773.
- Frobenius manifolds, quantum cohomology, and moduli spaces. American Mathematical Society. 1999.
- Quantum groups and non commutative geometry. Montreal: Centre de Recherches Mathématiques. 1988.
- Topics in non-commutative geometry. Princeton University Press. 1991. ISBN 978-0-691-63578-1.
- Gauge field theory and complex geometry. Grundlehren der mathematischen Wissenschaften. Springer. 1988.
- Cubic forms - algebra, geometry, arithmetics. North Holland. 1986.
- A course in mathematical logic. Springer. 1977., second expanded edition with new chapters by the author and Boris Zilber, Springer 2010.
- Computable and Uncomputable (in Russian). Moscow: Sovetskoye Radio. 1980.
- Mathematics and physics. Birkhäuser. 1981.
- Manin, Yu. I. (1984). "New dimensions in geometry". Arbeitstagung. Lectures Notes in Mathematics. Vol. 1111. Bonn: Springer. pp. 59–101. doi:10.1007/BFb0084585. ISBN 978-3-540-15195-1.
- Manin, Yuri; Kostrikin, Alexei I. (1989). Linear algebra and geometry. London, England: Gordon and Breach. doi:10.1201/9781466593480. ISBN 978-0-429-07381-6. S2CID 124713118.
- Manin, Yu. I. (1968) Lectures on Algebraic Geometry. Moscow: Moscow University Press. Translated by Dimitry Leites and edited by Andrei Iacob as Introduction to the Theory of Schemes Moscow Lectures, Vol. 1, Cham, Switzerland: Springer. 2018.
- Manin, Yuri; Gelfand, Sergei (1994). Homological algebra. Encyclopedia of Mathematical Sciences. Springer.
- Manin, Yuri; Gelfand, Sergei (1996). Methods of Homological algebra. Springer Monographs in Mathematics. Springer. doi:10.1007/978-3-662-12492-5. ISBN 978-3-642-07813-2.
- Manin, Yuri; Kobzarev, Igor (1989). Elementary Particles: mathematics, physics and philosophy. Dordrecht: Kluwer.
- Manin, Yuri; Panchishkin, Alexei A. (1995). Introduction to Number theory. Springer.
- Manin, Yuri I. (2001). "Moduli, Motives, Mirrors". European Congress of Mathematics. Progress in Mathematics. Barcelona: Birkhäuser. pp. 53–73. doi:10.1007/978-3-0348-8268-2_4. hdl:21.11116/0000-0004-357E-4. ISBN 978-3-0348-9497-5.
- "Classical computing, quantum computing and Shor´s factoring algorithm" (PDF). Numdam. Bourbaki Seminar. 1999.
- Rademacher, Hans; Toeplitz, Otto (2002). Von Zahlen und Figuren [From Numbers and Figures] (in German). doi:10.1007/978-3-662-36239-6. ISBN 978-3-662-35411-7.
- Manin, Yuri; Marcolli, Matilde (2002). "Holography principle and arithmetic of algebraic curves". Advances in Theoretical and Mathematical Physics. 5 (3). Max-Planck-Institut für Mathematik, Bonn: International Press: 617–650. arXiv:hep-th/0201036. doi:10.4310/ATMP.2001.v5.n3.a6. S2CID 25731842.
- Manin, Yu. I. (December 1991). "Three-dimensional hyperbolic geometry as ∞-adic Arakelov geometry". Inventiones Mathematicae. 104 (1): 223–243. Bibcode:1991InMat.104..223M. doi:10.1007/BF01245074. S2CID 121350567.
- Mathematik, Kunst und Zivilisation [Mathematics, Art and Civilisation]. Die weltweit besten mathematischen Artikel im 21. Jahrhundert. Vol. 3. e-enterprise. 2014. ISBN 978-3-945059-15-9.

== See also ==
- Arithmetic topology
- Noncommutative residue
