= Weber's theorem (algebraic curves) =

In mathematics, Weber's theorem, named after Heinrich Martin Weber, is a result on algebraic curves. It states the following.

Consider two non-singular curves C and C′ having the same genus g > 1. If there is a rational correspondence φ between C and C′, then φ is a birational transformation.
