= Tate–Shafarevich group =

Group in arithmetic geometry

In arithmetic geometry, the Tate–Shafarevich group Ш(A/K) of an abelian variety A (or more generally a group scheme) defined over a number field K consists of the elements of the Weil–Châtelet group $\mathrm{WC}(A/K) = H^1(G_K, A)$, where $G_K = \mathrm{Gal}(K^{alg}/K)$ is the absolute Galois group of K, that become trivial in all of the completions of K (i.e., the real and complex completions as well as the p-adic fields obtained from K by completing with respect to all its Archimedean and non Archimedean valuations v). Thus, in terms of Galois cohomology, Ш(A/K) can be defined as

$$\bigcap_v\mathrm{ker}\left(H^1\left(G_K,A\right)\rightarrow H^1\left(G_{K_v},A_v\right)\right).$$

This group was introduced by Serge Lang and John Tate and Igor Shafarevich. Cassels introduced the notation Ш(A/K), where Ш is the Cyrillic letter "Sha", for Shafarevich, replacing the older notation TS or TŠ.

== Elements of the Tate–Shafarevich group ==
Geometrically, the non-trivial elements of the Tate–Shafarevich group can be thought of as the homogeneous spaces of A that have K_{v}-rational points for every place v of K, but no K-rational point. Thus, the group measures the extent to which the Hasse principle fails to hold for rational equations with coefficients in the field K. Carl-Erik Lind gave an example of such a homogeneous space, by showing that the genus 1 curve x^{4} − 17 = 2y^{2} has solutions over the reals and over all p-adic fields, but has no rational points. Ernst S. Selmer gave many more examples, such as 3x^{3} + 4y^{3} + 5z^{3} = 0.

The special case of the Tate–Shafarevich group for the finite group scheme consisting of points of some given finite order n of an abelian variety is closely related to the Selmer group.

== Tate–Shafarevich conjecture ==
The Tate–Shafarevich conjecture states that the Tate–Shafarevich group is finite. Karl Rubin proved this for some elliptic curves of rank at most 1 with complex multiplication. Victor A. Kolyvagin extended this to modular elliptic curves over the rationals of analytic rank at most 1. (The modularity theorem later showed that the modularity assumption always holds.)

It is known that the Tate–Shafarevich group is a torsion group, thus the conjecture is equivalent to stating that the group is finitely generated.

== Cassels–Tate pairing ==
The Cassels–Tate pairing is a bilinear pairing Ш(A) × Ш(Â) → Q/Z, where A is an abelian variety and Â is its dual. Cassels introduced this for elliptic curves, when A can be identified with Â and the pairing is an alternating form. The kernel of this form is the subgroup of divisible elements, which is trivial if the Tate–Shafarevich conjecture is true. Tate extended the pairing to general abelian varieties, as a variation of Tate duality. A choice of polarization on A gives a map from A to Â, which induces a bilinear pairing on Ш(A) with values in Q/Z, but unlike the case of elliptic curves this need not be alternating or even skew symmetric.

For an elliptic curve, Cassels showed that the pairing is alternating, and a consequence is that if the order of Ш is finite then it is a square. For more general abelian varieties it was sometimes incorrectly believed for many years that the order of Ш is a square whenever it is finite; this mistake originated in a paper by Swinnerton-Dyer, who misquoted one of the results of Tate. Poonen and Stoll gave some examples where the order is twice a square, such as the Jacobian of a certain genus 2 curve over the rationals whose Tate–Shafarevich group has order 2, and Stein gave some examples where the power of an odd prime dividing the order is odd. If the abelian variety has a principal polarization then the form on Ш is skew symmetric which implies that the order of Ш is a square or twice a square (if it is finite), and if in addition the principal polarization comes from a rational divisor (as is the case for elliptic curves) then the form is alternating and the order of Ш is a square (if it is finite). On the other hand building on the results just presented Konstantinou showed that for any squarefree number n there is an abelian variety A defined over Q and an integer m with |Ш| = n⋅m^{2}. In particular Ш is finite in Konstantinou's examples and these examples confirm a conjecture of Stein. Thus modulo squares any integer can be the order of Ш.

== See also ==
- Birch and Swinnerton-Dyer conjecture
- Manin obstruction
