= Local analysis =

Mathematical theories

In algebraic geometry and related areas of mathematics, local analysis is the practice of looking at a problem relative to each prime number p first, and then later trying to integrate the information gained at each prime into a 'global' picture. These are forms of the localization approach.

== Group theory ==
In group theory, local analysis was started by the Sylow theorems, which contain significant information about the structure of a finite group G for each prime number p dividing the order of G. This area of study was enormously developed in the quest for the classification of finite simple groups, starting with the Feit–Thompson theorem that groups of odd order are solvable.

== Number theory ==
In number theory one may study a Diophantine equation, for example, modulo p for all primes p, looking for constraints on solutions. The next step is to look modulo prime powers, and then for solutions in the p-adic field. This kind of local analysis provides conditions for solution that are necessary. In cases where local analysis (plus the condition that there are real solutions) provides also sufficient conditions, one says that the Hasse principle holds: this is the best possible situation. It does for quadratic forms, but certainly not in general (for example for elliptic curves). The point of view that one would like to understand what extra conditions are needed has been very influential, for example for cubic forms.

Some form of local analysis underlies both the standard applications of the Hardy–Littlewood circle method in analytic number theory, and the use of adele rings, making this one of the unifying principles across number theory.

== See also ==
- Category:Localization (mathematics)
- Localization of a category
- Localization of a module
- Localization of a ring
- Localization of a topological space
- Hasse principle
