= Hasse norm theorem =

Theorem in number theory

In number theory, the Hasse norm theorem states that if L/K is a cyclic extension of number fields, then if a nonzero element of K is a local norm everywhere, then it is a global norm. Here to be a global norm means to be an element k of K such that there is an element l of L with $\mathbf{N}_{L/K}(l) = k$; in other words k is a relative norm of some element of the extension field L. To be a local norm means that for some prime p of K and some prime P of L lying over K, then k is a norm from L_{P}; here the "prime" p can be an archimedean valuation, and the theorem is a statement about completions in all valuations, archimedean and non-archimedean.

The theorem is no longer true in general if the extension is abelian but not cyclic. Hasse gave the counterexample that 3 is a local norm everywhere for the extension ${\mathbf Q}(\sqrt{-3},\sqrt{13})/{\mathbf Q}$ but is not a global norm. Serre and Tate showed that another counterexample is given by the field ${\mathbf Q}(\sqrt{13},\sqrt{17})/{\mathbf Q}$ where every rational square is a local norm everywhere but $5^2$ is not a global norm.

This is an example of a theorem stating a local-global principle.

The full theorem is due to Hasse (1931). The special case when the degree n of the extension is 2 was proved by Hilbert (1897), and the special case when n is prime was proved by Furtwangler in 1902.

The Hasse norm theorem can be deduced from the theorem that an element of the Galois cohomology group H^{2}(L/K) is trivial if it is trivial locally everywhere, which is in turn equivalent to the deep theorem that the first cohomology of the idele class group vanishes. This is true for all finite Galois extensions of number fields, not just cyclic ones. For cyclic extensions the group H^{2}(L/K) is isomorphic to the Tate cohomology group H^{0}(L/K) which describes which elements are norms, so for cyclic extensions it becomes Hasse's theorem that an element is a norm if it is a local norm everywhere.

== See also ==
- Grunwald–Wang theorem, about when an element that is a power everywhere locally is a power.
