= Helmut Hasse =

German mathematician (1898–1979)

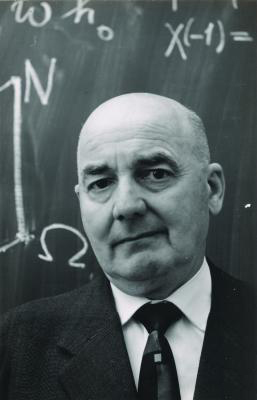
- Born: 25 August 1898; Kassel, Hesse-Nassau, Prussia, German Empire
- Died: 26 December 1979 (aged 81); Ahrensburg, Schleswig-Holstein, West Germany
- Education: University of Marburg; University of Göttingen
- Known for: Conductor-discriminant formula Hasse's theorem on elliptic curves Hasse–Schmidt derivation
- Scientific career
- Fields: Mathematics
- Thesis: Über die Darstellbarkeit von Zahlen durch quadratische Formen im Körper der rationalen Zahlen (1922)
- Doctoral advisor: Kurt Hensel
- Doctoral students: Cahit Arf; Wolfgang Franz; Hans-Wilhelm Knobloch; Paul Lorenzen; Curt Meyer; Peter Roquette; Otto Schilling; Oswald Teichmüller

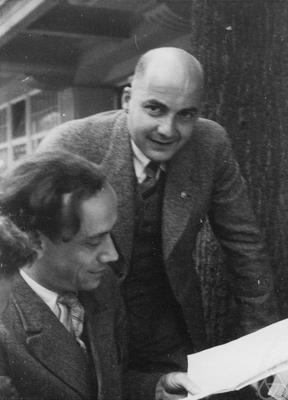
Hasse with Emil Artin in 1930

Helmut Hasse (German: [ˈhasə]; 25 August 1898 – 26 December 1979) was a German mathematician working in algebraic number theory, known for fundamental contributions to class field theory, the application of p-adic numbers to local class field theory and diophantine geometry (Hasse principle), and to local zeta functions.

== Life ==
Hasse was born in Kassel, Province of Hesse-Nassau, the son of Judge Paul Reinhard Hasse, also written Haße (12 April 1868 – 1 June 1940, son of Friedrich Ernst Hasse and his wife Anna Von Reinhard) and his wife Margarethe Louise Adolphine Quentin (born 5 July 1872 in Milwaukee, daughter of retail toy merchant Adolph Quentin (b. May 1832, probably Berlin, Kingdom of Prussia) and Margarethe Wehr (b. about 1840, Prussia), then raised in Kassel).

After serving in the Imperial German Navy in World War I, he studied at the University of Göttingen, and then at the University of Marburg under Kurt Hensel, writing a dissertation in 1921 containing the Hasse–Minkowski theorem, as it is now called, on quadratic forms over number fields. He then held positions at Kiel, Halle and Marburg. He was Hermann Weyl's replacement at Göttingen in 1934.

Hasse was an Invited Speaker of the International Congress of Mathematicians (ICM) in 1932 in Zürich and a Plenary Speaker of the ICM in 1936 in Oslo.

In 1933 Hasse had signed the Vow of allegiance of the Professors of the German Universities and High-Schools to Adolf Hitler and the National Socialistic State.

In 1937, he applied for membership in the Nazi Party on guidance from a close friend to help hire distinguished mathematicians at Göttingen. This application was denied to him allegedly due to his remote Jewish ancestry. After the war, he briefly returned to Göttingen in 1945, but was excluded by the British authorities. After brief appointments in Berlin, from 1948 on he settled permanently as professor at University of Hamburg.

He collaborated with many mathematicians, in particular with Emmy Noether and Richard Brauer on simple algebras, and with Harold Davenport on Gauss sums (Hasse–Davenport relations), and with Cahit Arf on the Hasse–Arf theorem.

== Publications ==
- Leopoldt, Heinrich-Wolfgang; Roquette, Peter, eds. (1975), Helmut Hasse: Mathematische Abhandlungen, de Gruyter (3 vols.)
- Number theory, Springer, 1980, 2002 (Eng. trans. of Zahlentheorie, 3rd edn., Akademie Verlag 1969)
- Vorlesungen über Zahlentheorie, Springer, 1950
- Über die Klassenzahl abelscher Zahlkörper, Akademie Verlag, Berlin, 1952.
- Höhere Algebra vols. 1, 2, Sammlung Göschen, 1967, 1969
- Vorlesungen über Klassenkörpertheorie, physica Verlag, Würzburg 1967
- Hasse, H. (1926), "Bericht über neuere Untersuchungen und Probleme aus der Theorie der algebraischen Zahlkörper. I: Klassenkörpertheorie.", Jahresbericht der Deutschen Mathematiker-Vereinigung (in German), 35: 1–55
- Hasse, H. (1927), "Bericht über neuere Untersuchungen und Probleme aus der Theorie der algebraischen Zahlkörper. Teil Ia: Beweise zu I.", Jahresbericht der Deutschen Mathematiker-Vereinigung (in German), 36: 233–311
- Hasse, H. (1930), "Bericht über neuere Untersuchungen und Probleme aus der Theorie der algebraischen Zahlkörper. Teil II: Reziprozitätsgesetz", Jahresbericht der Deutschen Mathematiker-Vereinigung (in German), Ergänzungsband 6
- Bericht über neuere Untersuchungen und Probleme aus der Theorie der algebraischen Zahlkörper, 1965 (reprint from Berichts aus dem Jahresbericht der DMV 1926/27)
- New edn. of Algebraische Theorie der Körper by Ernst Steinitz, together with Reinhold Baer, with a new appendix on Galois theory. Walter de Gruyter 1930.
- Hasse Mathematik als Wissenschaft, Kunst und Macht, DMV Mitteilungen 1997, Nr.4 (Published version of a lecture given at the University of Hamburg 1959)
- Hasse „Geschichte der Klassenkörpertheorie“, Jahresbericht DMV 1966
- Hasse „Die moderne algebraische Methode“, Jahresbericht DMV 1930
- Brauer, Hasse, Noether „Beweis eines Hauptsatzes in der Theorie der Algebren“, Journal reine angew.Math. 1932
- Hasse „Theorie der abstrakten elliptischen Funktionenkörper 3- Riemann Vermutung“, Journal reine angew. Math., 1936
- Hasse „Über die Darstellbarkeit von Zahlen durch quadratische Formen im Körper der rationalen Zahlen“, Journal reine angew.Math. 1923

== See also ==
- Hasse diagram
- Hasse invariant of an algebra
- Hasse invariant of an elliptic curve
- Hasse invariant of a quadratic form
- Artin–Hasse exponential
- Hasse–Weil L-function
- Hasse norm theorem
- Hasse's algorithm
- Hasse's theorem on elliptic curves
- Hasse–Witt matrix
- Albert–Brauer–Hasse–Noether theorem
- Dedekind–Hasse norm
- Collatz conjecture
- Local class field theory
