= Manin obstruction =

In mathematics, in the field of arithmetic algebraic geometry, the Manin obstruction (named after Yuri Manin) is attached to a variety X over a global field, which measures the failure of the Hasse principle for X. If the value of the obstruction is non-trivial, then X may have points over all local fields but not over the global field. The Manin obstruction is sometimes called the Brauer–Manin obstruction, as Manin used the Brauer group of X to define it.

For abelian varieties the Manin obstruction is just the Tate–Shafarevich group and fully accounts for the failure of the local-to-global principle (under the assumption that the Tate–Shafarevich group is finite). There are however examples, due to Alexei Skorobogatov, of varieties with trivial Manin obstruction which have points everywhere locally and yet no global points.
