= Quaternion algebra =

Generalization of quaternions to other fields

In mathematics, a quaternion algebra over a field F is a central simple algebra A over F that has dimension 4 over F. Every quaternion algebra becomes a matrix algebra by extending scalars (equivalently, tensoring with a field extension), i.e. for a suitable field extension K of F, $A \otimes_F K$ is isomorphic to the 2 × 2 matrix algebra over K.

The notion of a quaternion algebra can be seen as a generalization of Hamilton's quaternions to an arbitrary base field. The Hamilton quaternions are a quaternion algebra (in the above sense) over $F = \mathbb{R}$, and indeed the only one over $\mathbb{R}$ apart from the 2 × 2 real matrix algebra, up to isomorphism. When $F = \mathbb{C}$, then the biquaternions form the quaternion algebra over F.

== Structure ==
Quaternion algebra here means something more general than the algebra of Hamilton's quaternions. When the coefficient field F does not have characteristic 2, every quaternion algebra over F can be described as a 4-dimensional F-vector space with basis $\{ 1, i, j, k\}$, with the following multiplication rules:

$$i^2=a$$
$$j^2=b$$
$$ij=k$$
$$ji=-k$$

where a and b are any given nonzero elements of F. From these rules we get:

$$k^2=ijij=-iijj=-ab.$$

The classical instances where $F=\mathbb{R}$ are Hamilton's quaternions (a = b = −1) and split-quaternions (a = −1, b = +1). In split-quaternions, $k^2 = +1$ and $j k = - i$, differing from Hamilton's equations.

The algebra defined in this way is denoted (a,b)_{F} or simply (a,b). For $q = t + xi + yj +zk$ with conjugate $q^* = t - xi - yj - zk \ ,$ the anticommutative property of i, j, and k imply $qq^* = t^2 - a x^2 - b y^2 + ab z^2 .$ A quaternion algebra (a,b)_{F} is either a division algebra or isomorphic to the matrix algebra of 2 × 2 matrices over F; the latter case is a split algebra. The norm form

$$N(t + xi +yj + zk) = qq^* = t^2 - ax^2 - by^2 + abz^2 \$$

defines a structure of division algebra if and only if the norm is an anisotropic quadratic form, that is, zero only on the zero element. For then $q^* / N(q)$ is the multiplicative inverse of q.

The conic C(a,b) defined by

$$a x^2 + b y^2 = z^2 \$$

has a point (x,y,z) with coordinates in F in the split case.

=== Unitary representation ===
A quaternion algebra over real numbers can be represented by certain 2x2 complex matrices of the form

$$\begin{pmatrix}u & v \\ \pm \bar{v} & \bar{u} \end{pmatrix} .$$

The determinant is $u \bar{u} \pm v \bar{v} ,$ where the plus corresponds to the division ring of quaternions, and the minus to split-quaternions.

== Application ==
Quaternion algebras are applied in number theory, particularly to quadratic forms. They are concrete structures that generate the elements of order two in the Brauer group of F. For some fields, including algebraic number fields, every element of order 2 in its Brauer group is represented by a quaternion algebra. A theorem of Alexander Merkurjev implies that each element of order 2 in the Brauer group of any field is represented by a tensor product of quaternion algebras. In particular, over p-adic fields the construction of quaternion algebras can be viewed as the quadratic Hilbert symbol of local class field theory.

== Classification ==
The products of a basis of F^{4}, some of which respect the anti-commutative property, generate a non-abelian group of at least order 8. When limited to 8, there are just two groups that serve: the quaternion group and the dihedral group of order 8. The products of an arbitrary pair from F^{4} are determined by the group generated by the basis. When Q_{8} or D_{4} is selected for the algebra on F^{4}, a quaternion algebra over F is determined.

In a similar way, over any local field F there are exactly two quaternion algebras: the 2 × 2 matrices over F and a division algebra. But the quaternion division algebra over a local field is usually not Hamilton's quaternions over the field. For example, over the p-adic numbers Hamilton's quaternions are a division algebra only when p is 2. For odd prime p, the p-adic Hamilton quaternions are isomorphic to the 2 × 2 matrices over the p-adics. To see the p-adic Hamilton quaternions are not a division algebra for odd prime p, observe that the congruence x^{2} + y^{2} = −1 mod p is solvable and therefore by Hensel's lemma — here is where p being odd is needed — the equation

x^{2} + y^{2} = −1

is solvable in the p-adic numbers. Therefore the quaternion

xi + yj + k

has norm 0 and hence doesn't have a multiplicative inverse.

One way to classify the F-algebra isomorphism classes of all quaternion algebras for a given field F is to use the one-to-one correspondence between isomorphism classes of quaternion algebras over F and isomorphism classes of their norm forms.

To every quaternion algebra A, one can associate a quadratic form N (called the norm form) on A such that

$$N(xy) = N(x)N(y)$$

for all x and y in A. It turns out that the possible norm forms for quaternion F-algebras are exactly the Pfister 2-forms.

== Quaternion algebras over the rational numbers ==
Quaternion algebras over the rational numbers have an arithmetic theory similar to, but more complicated than, that of quadratic extensions of $\mathbb{Q}$.

Let $B$ be a quaternion algebra over $\mathbb{Q}$ and let $\nu$ be a place of $\mathbb{Q}$, with completion $\mathbb{Q}_\nu$ (so it is either the p-adic numbers $\mathbb{Q}_p$ for some prime p or the real numbers $\mathbb{R}$). Define $B_\nu:= \mathbb{Q}_\nu \otimes_{\mathbb{Q}} B$, which is a quaternion algebra over $\mathbb{Q}_\nu$. So there are two choices for $B_\nu$: the 2 × 2 matrices over $\mathbb{Q}_\nu$ or a division algebra.

We say that $B$ is split (or unramified) at $\nu$ if $B_\nu$ is isomorphic to the 2 × 2 matrices over $\mathbb{Q}_\nu$. We say that B is non-split (or ramified) at $\nu$ if $B_\nu$ is the quaternion division algebra over $\mathbb{Q}_\nu$. For example, the rational Hamilton quaternions is non-split at 2 and at $\infty$ and split at all odd primes. The rational 2 × 2 matrices are split at all places.

A quaternion algebra over the rationals which splits at $\infty$ is analogous to a real quadratic field and one which is non-split at $\infty$ is analogous to an imaginary quadratic field. The analogy comes from a quadratic field having real embeddings when the minimal polynomial for a generator splits over the reals and having non-real embeddings otherwise. One illustration of the strength of this analogy concerns unit groups in an order of a rational quaternion algebra: it is infinite if the quaternion algebra splits at $\infty$ and it is finite otherwise, just as the unit group of an order in a quadratic ring is infinite in the real quadratic case and finite otherwise.

The number of places where a quaternion algebra over the rationals ramifies is always even, and this is equivalent to the quadratic reciprocity law over the rationals. Moreover, the places where B ramifies determines B up to isomorphism as an algebra. (In other words, non-isomorphic quaternion algebras over the rationals do not share the same set of ramified places.) The product of the primes at which B ramifies is called the discriminant of B.

== See also ==
- Composition algebra
- Cyclic algebra
- Octonion algebra
- Hurwitz quaternion order
- Hurwitz quaternion
