= Simple ring =

Type of ring in non-commutative algebra

In mathematics, a simple ring is a non-zero ring that has no two-sided ideals besides the zero ideal and itself. In particular, a commutative ring is a simple ring if and only if it is a field.

The center of a simple ring is necessarily a field. It follows that a simple ring is an associative algebra over this field. It is then called a simple algebra over this field.

Several references (e.g., Lang (2002) or Bourbaki (2012)) require in addition that a simple ring be left or right Artinian (or equivalently semi-simple). Under such terminology a non-zero ring with no non-trivial two-sided ideals is called quasi-simple.

Rings which are simple as rings but are not a simple module over themselves do exist: a full matrix ring over a field does not have any nontrivial two-sided ideals (since any ideal of $\mathrm{M}_n(R)$ is of the form $\mathrm{M}_n(I)$ with $I$ an ideal of $R$), but it has nontrivial left ideals (for example, the sets of matrices which have some fixed zero columns).

An immediate example of a simple ring is a division ring, where every nonzero element has a multiplicative inverse, for instance, the quaternions. Also, for any $n \ge 1$, the algebra of $n \times n$ matrices with entries in a division ring is simple.

Joseph Wedderburn proved that if a ring $R$ is a finite-dimensional simple algebra over a field $k$, it is isomorphic to a matrix algebra over some division algebra over $k$. In particular, the only simple rings that are finite-dimensional algebras over the real numbers are rings of matrices over either the real numbers, the complex numbers, or the quaternions.

Wedderburn proved these results in 1907 in his doctoral thesis, On hypercomplex numbers, which appeared in the Proceedings of the London Mathematical Society. His thesis classified finite-dimensional simple and also semisimple algebras over fields. Simple algebras are building blocks of semisimple algebras: any finite-dimensional semisimple algebra is a Cartesian product, in the sense of algebras, of finite-dimensional simple algebras.

One must be careful of the terminology: not every simple ring is a semisimple ring, and not every simple algebra is a semisimple algebra. However, every finite-dimensional simple algebra is a semisimple algebra, and every simple ring that is left- or right-artinian is a semisimple ring.

Wedderburn's result was later generalized to semisimple rings in the Wedderburn–Artin theorem: this says that every semisimple ring is a finite product of matrix rings over division rings. As a consequence of this generalization, every simple ring that is left- or right-artinian is a matrix ring over a division ring.

== Examples ==
Let $\mathbb{R}$ be the field of real numbers, $\mathbb{C}$ be the field of complex numbers, and $\mathbb{H}$ the quaternions.

- A central simple algebra (sometimes called a Brauer algebra) is a simple finite-dimensional algebra over a field $F$ whose center is $F$.
- Every finite-dimensional simple algebra over $\mathbb{R}$ is isomorphic to an algebra of $n \times n$ matrices with entries in $\mathbb{R}$, $\mathbb{C}$, or $\mathbb{H}$. Every central simple algebra over $\mathbb{R}$ is isomorphic to an algebra of $n \times n$ matrices with entries $\mathbb{R}$ or $\mathbb{H}$. These results follow from the Frobenius theorem.
- Every finite-dimensional simple algebra over $\mathbb{C}$ is a central simple algebra, and is isomorphic to a matrix ring over $\mathbb{C}$.
- Every finite-dimensional central simple algebra over a finite field is isomorphic to a matrix ring over that field.
- Over a field of characteristic zero, the Weyl algebra is simple but not semisimple, and in particular not a matrix algebra over a division algebra over its center; the Weyl algebra is infinite-dimensional, so Wedderburn's theorem does not apply to it.

== See also ==
- Simple (algebra)
- Simple algebra (universal algebra)
