= Galois cohomology =

Group comohology of Galois modules

In mathematics, Galois cohomology is the study of the group cohomology of Galois modules, that is, the application of homological algebra to modules for Galois groups. A Galois group G associated with a field extension L/K acts in a natural way on some abelian groups, for example those constructed directly from L, but also through other Galois representations that may be derived by more abstract means. Galois cohomology accounts for the way in which taking Galois-invariant elements fails to be an exact functor.

== History ==
The current theory of Galois cohomology came together around 1950, when it was realised that the Galois cohomology of ideal class groups in algebraic number theory was one way to formulate class field theory. At the time it was in the process of ridding itself of connections to L-functions. Galois cohomology makes no assumption that Galois groups are abelian groups, so this was a non-abelian theory. It was formulated abstractly as a theory of class formations. Two developments of the 1960s turned the position around. Firstly, Galois cohomology appeared as the foundational layer of étale cohomology theory (roughly speaking, the theory as it applies to zero-dimensional schemes). Secondly, non-abelian class field theory was launched as part of the Langlands philosophy.

The earliest results identifiable as Galois cohomology had been known long before, in algebraic number theory and the arithmetic of elliptic curves. The normal basis theorem implies that the first cohomology group of the additive group of L will vanish; this is a result on general field extensions, but was known in some form to Richard Dedekind. The corresponding result for the multiplicative group is known as Hilbert's Theorem 90, and was known before 1900. Kummer theory was another such early part of the theory, giving a description of the connecting homomorphism coming from the m-th power map.

In fact, for a while the multiplicative case of a 1-cocycle for groups that are not necessarily cyclic was formulated as the solubility of Noether's equations, named for Emmy Noether; they appear under this name in Emil Artin's treatment of Galois theory, and may have been folklore in the 1920s. The case of 2-cocycles for the multiplicative group is that of the Brauer group, and the implications seem to have been well known to algebraists of the 1930s.

In another direction, that of torsors, these were already implicit in the infinite descent arguments of Fermat for elliptic curves. Numerous direct calculations were done, and the proof of the Mordell–Weil theorem had to proceed by some surrogate of a finiteness proof for a particular H^{1} group. The 'twisted' nature of objects over fields that are not algebraically closed, which are not isomorphic but become so over the algebraic closure, was also known in many cases linked to other algebraic groups (such as quadratic forms, simple algebras, Severi–Brauer varieties), in the 1930s, before the general theory arrived.

The needs of number theory were in particular expressed by the requirement to have control of a local-global principle for Galois cohomology. This was formulated by means of results in class field theory, such as Hasse's norm theorem. In the case of elliptic curves, it led to the key definition of the Tate–Shafarevich group in the Selmer group, which is the obstruction to the success of a local-global principle. Despite its great importance, for example in the Birch and Swinnerton-Dyer conjecture, it proved very difficult to get any control of it, until results of Karl Rubin gave a way to show in some cases it was finite (a result generally believed, since its conjectural order was predicted by an L-function formula).

The other major development of the theory, also involving John Tate was the Tate–Poitou duality result.

Technically speaking, G may be a profinite group, in which case the definitions need to be adjusted to allow only continuous cochains.

== Formal details ==
Galois cohomology is the study of the group cohomology of Galois groups. Let $L|K$ be a field extension with Galois group $G(L|K)$ and $M$ an abelian group on which $G(L|K)$ acts. The cohomology group:
$$H^n(L|K, M) := H^n(G(L|K),M),\quad n\ge 0$$
is the Galois cohomology group associated to the representation of the Galois group on $M$. It is possible, moreover, to extend this definition to the case when $M$ is a non-abelian group and $n=0,1$, and this extension is required for some of the most important applications of the theory. In particular, $H^0(L|K,M)$ is the set of fixed points of the Galois group in $M$, and $H^1(L|K,M)$ is related to the 1-cocycles (which parametrize quaternion algebras for instance).

When the extension field $L=K^s$ is the separable closure of the field $K$, one often writes instead $G_K = G(K^s|K)$ (the absolute Galois group) and
$$H^n(K,M) := H^n(G_K,M).$$

Hilbert's theorem 90 in cohomological language is the statement that the first cohomology group with values in the multiplicative group of $L$ is trivial for a Galois extension $L|K$:
$$H^1(L|K,L^*)=1.$$
This vanishing theorem can be generalized to a large class of algebraic groups, also formulated in the language of Galois cohomology. The most straightforward generalization is that for any quasisplit $K$-torus $T$,
$$H^1(K,T) = 1.$$
Denote by $GL_n(L)$ the general linear group in $n$ dimensions. Then Hilbert 90 is the $n=1$ special case of
$$H^1(L|K,GL_n(L))=1.$$
Likewise, the vanishing theorem holds for the special linear group $SL_n(L)$ and for the symplectic group $Sp(\omega)_L$ where $\omega$ is a non-degenerate alternating bilinear form defined over $K$.

The second cohomology group describes the factor systems attached to the Galois group. Thus for any normal extension $L|K$, the relative Brauer group can be identified with the group
$$Br(L|K) = H^2(L|K, L^*).$$
As a special case, with the separable closure,
$$Br(K) = H^2(K,(K^s)^*).$$
