= Central simple algebra =

Finite dimensional algebra over a field whose central elements are that field

In ring theory and related areas of mathematics a central simple algebra (CSA) over a field K is a finite-dimensional associative K-algebra A that is simple, and for which the center is exactly K.

For example, the complex numbers C form a CSA over themselves, but not over the real numbers R (the center of C is all of C, not just R). The quaternions H form a 4-dimensional CSA over R, and in fact represent the only non-trivial element of the Brauer group of the reals (see below). Finite-dimensionality is essential to the definition: for instance, for a field F of characteristic 0, the Weyl algebra $F[X,\partial_X]$ is a simple algebra with center F, but is not a central simple algebra over F as it has infinite dimension as a F-module.

By the Artin–Wedderburn theorem, a finite-dimensional simple algebra A is isomorphic to the matrix algebra M(n,S) for some division ring S. Given two central simple algebras A ~ M(n,S) and B ~ M(m,T) over the same field F, A and B are called similar (or Brauer equivalent) if their division rings S and T are isomorphic. The set of all equivalence classes of central simple algebras over a given field F, under this equivalence relation, can be equipped with a group operation given by the tensor product of algebras. The resulting group is called the Brauer group Br(F) of the field F. It is always a torsion group.

== Properties ==
- According to the Artin–Wedderburn theorem a finite-dimensional simple algebra A is isomorphic to the matrix algebra M(n,S) for some division ring S. Hence, there is a unique division algebra in each Brauer equivalence class.
- Every automorphism of a central simple algebra is an inner automorphism (this follows from the Skolem–Noether theorem).
- The dimension of a central simple algebra as a vector space over its centre is always a square: the degree is the square root of this dimension. The Schur index of a central simple algebra is the degree of the equivalent division algebra: it depends only on the Brauer class of the algebra.
- The period or exponent of a central simple algebra is the order of its Brauer class as an element of the Brauer group. It is a divisor of the index, and the two numbers are composed of the same prime factors.
- If S is a simple subalgebra of a central simple algebra A then dim_{F} S divides dim_{F} A.
- Every 4-dimensional central simple algebra over a field F is isomorphic to a quaternion algebra; in fact, it is either a two-by-two matrix algebra, or a division algebra.
- If D is a central division algebra over K for which the index has prime factorisation

$$\mathrm{ind}(D) = \prod_{i=1}^r p_i^{m_i} \$$

then D has a tensor product decomposition

$$D = \bigotimes_{i=1}^r D_i \$$

where each component D_{i} is a central division algebra of index $p_i^{m_i}$, and the components are uniquely determined up to isomorphism.

== Splitting field ==
We call a field E a splitting field for A over K if A⊗E is isomorphic to a matrix ring over E. Every finite dimensional CSA has a splitting field: indeed, in the case when A is a division algebra, then a maximal subfield of A is a splitting field. In general by theorems of Wedderburn and Koethe there is a splitting field which is a separable extension of K of degree equal to the index of A, and this splitting field is isomorphic to a subfield of A. As an example, the field C splits the quaternion algebra H over R with

$$t + x \mathbf{i} + y \mathbf{j} + z \mathbf{k} \leftrightarrow
\left({\begin{array}{*{20}c} t + x i & y + z i \\ -y + z i & t - x i \end{array}}\right) .$$

We can use the existence of the splitting field to define reduced norm and reduced trace for a CSA A. Map A to a matrix ring over a splitting field and define the reduced norm and trace to be the composite of this map with determinant and trace respectively. For example, in the quaternion algebra H, the splitting above shows that the element t + x i + y j + z k has reduced norm t^{2} + x^{2} + y^{2} + z^{2} and reduced trace 2t.

The reduced norm is multiplicative and the reduced trace is additive. An element a of A is invertible if and only if its reduced norm is non-zero: hence a CSA is a division algebra if and only if the reduced norm is non-zero on the non-zero elements.

== Generalization ==
CSAs over a field K are a non-commutative analog to extension fields over K – in both cases, they have no non-trivial 2-sided ideals, and have a distinguished field in their center, though a CSA can be non-commutative and need not have inverses (need not be a division algebra). This is of particular interest in noncommutative number theory as generalizations of number fields (extensions of the rationals Q); see noncommutative number field.

== See also ==
- Azumaya algebra, generalization of CSAs where the base field is replaced by a commutative local ring
- Severi–Brauer variety
- Posner's theorem
