= Clark Barwick =

American mathematician

- Born: January 9, 1980 (age 46)
- Education: University of North Carolina at Chapel Hill (BS); University of Pennsylvania (PhD)
- Known for: Theorem of the Heart; Unicity of the Homotopy Theory of Higher Categories
- Awards: Fulbright Visiting Professorship (2015); Berwick Prize (2019)
- Scientific career
- Fields: Mathematics
- Workplaces: University of Edinburgh; MIT
- Thesis: (∞,n)-Cat as a closed model category (2005)
- Doctoral advisor: Tony Pantev
- Website: www.maths.ed.ac.uk/~cbarwick/

Clark Edward Barwick (born January 9, 1980) is an American mathematician and professor of pure mathematics at the University of Edinburgh. His research is centered around homotopy theory, algebraic K-theory, higher category theory, and related areas.

== Early life and education ==
Barwick grew up in North Carolina, and in 2001 completed his BS in mathematics at the University of North Carolina at Chapel Hill. Barwick was then a graduate student at the University of Pennsylvania, and received his PhD in mathematics in 2005 under the direction of Tony Pantev.

== Career ==
Barwick held postdoctoral fellowships at the Mathematisches Institut Göttingen (2005–2006) and at the Matematisk Institutt, Universitetet i Oslo (2006–2007). Barwick spent the year 2007–2008 at the Institute for Advanced Study, and from 2008–2010 was a Benjamin Peirce Lecturer at Harvard. In 2010 Barwick became an assistant professor at MIT, and in 2013 he became the Cecil and Ida Green Career Development Assistant Professor of Mathematics. In 2015 Barwick was a Fulbright visiting professor at the University of Glasgow and was promoted to Cecil and Ida Green Career Development Associate Professor of Mathematics at MIT, a position which he held until he became a reader at the University of Edinburgh in 2017. In 2020, Barwick was promoted to a professor at the University of Edinburgh.

== Research and notable works ==
A theme in Barwick's work is the homotopy theory of higher categories. In his early career, he frequently collaborated with Dan Kan; much of their work was concerned with models for the homotopy theory of homotopy theories. In his joint work with Chris Schommer-Pries, Barwick proved a unicity theorem for the homotopy theory of (∞,n)-categories.

Barwick has also made contributions to algebraic K-theory. In particular, Barwick defined higher-categorical generalizations of Waldhausen categories and Waldhausen's S-construction and used these to extend Waldhausen's K-theory to the setting of (∞,1)-categories. Using this new theory, he proved the Theorem of the Heart for Waldhausen K-theory. In joint work with John Rognes, he generalized Quillen's Q-construction to the higher-categorical setting, providing higher-categorical generalizations of Quillen's Theorem B as well as Quillen's dévissage argument in the process. Much of his recent work has concerned equivariant algebraic K-theory and equivariant homotopy theory. Barwick won the 2019 Berwick Prize of the London Mathematical Society for his paper "On the algebraic K-theory of higher categories" where he "proves that Waldhausen's algebraic K-theory is the universal homology theory for ∞-categories, and uses this universality to reprove the major fundamental theorems of the subject in this new context."

In 2019 Barwick with his student Haine introduced the theory of pyknotic objects. Which was published coincidentally and is very closely related to that of condensed sets, with the main differences being set-theoretic in nature: pyknotic theory depends on a choice of Grothendieck universes, whereas condensed mathematics can be developed strictly within ZFC.
