= Additive K-theory =

In mathematics, additive K-theory means some version of algebraic K-theory in which, according to Spencer Bloch, the general linear group GL has everywhere been replaced by its Lie algebra gl. It is not, therefore, one theory but a way of creating additive or infinitesimal analogues of multiplicative theories.

== Formulation ==
Following Boris Feigin and Boris Tsygan, let $A$ be an algebra over a field $k$ of characteristic zero and let ${\mathfrak gl}(A)$ be the algebra of infinite matrices over $A$ with only finitely many nonzero entries. Then the Lie algebra homology

$$H_\cdot ({\mathfrak gl}(A),k)$$

has a natural structure of a Hopf algebra. The space of its primitive elements of degree $i$ is denoted by $K^+_i(A)$ and called the $i$-th additive K-functor of A.

The additive K-functors are related to cyclic homology groups by the isomorphism

$$HC_i(A) \cong K^+_{i+1}(A).$$
