= K-theory of a category =

Concept in algebra

In algebraic K-theory, the K-theory of a category C (usually equipped with some kind of additional data) is a sequence of abelian groups K_{i}(C) associated to it. If C is an abelian category, there is no need for extra data, but in general it only makes sense to speak of K-theory after specifying on C a structure of an exact category, or of a Waldhausen category, or of a dg-category, or possibly some other variants. Thus, there are several constructions of those groups, corresponding to various kinds of structures put on C. Traditionally, the K-theory of C is defined to be the result of a suitable construction, but in some contexts there are more conceptual definitions. For instance, the K-theory is a 'universal additive invariant' of dg-categories and small stable ∞-categories.

The motivation for this notion comes from algebraic K-theory of rings. For a ring R Daniel Quillen in Quillen (1973) introduced two equivalent ways to find the higher K-theory. The plus construction expresses K_{i}(R) in terms of R directly, but it's hard to prove properties of the result, including basic ones like functoriality. The other way is to consider the exact category of projective modules over R and to set K_{i}(R) to be the K-theory of that category, defined using the Q-construction. This approach proved to be more useful, and could be applied to other exact categories as well. Later Friedhelm Waldhausen in Waldhausen (1985) extended the notion of K-theory even further, to very different kinds of categories, including the category of topological spaces.

== K-theory of Waldhausen categories ==
In algebra, the S-construction is a construction in algebraic K-theory that produces a model that can be used to define higher K-groups. It is due to Friedhelm Waldhausen and concerns a category with cofibrations and weak equivalences; such a category is called a Waldhausen category and generalizes Quillen's exact category. A cofibration can be thought of as analogous to a monomorphism, and a category with cofibrations is one in which, roughly speaking, monomorphisms are stable under pushouts. According to Waldhausen, the "S" was chosen to stand for Graeme B. Segal.

Unlike the Q-construction, which produces a topological space, the S-construction produces a simplicial set.

=== Details ===
The arrow category $Ar(C)$ of a category C is a category whose objects are morphisms in C and whose morphisms are squares in C. Let a finite ordered set $[n] = \{ 0 < 1 < 2 < \cdots < n \}$ be viewed as a category in the usual way.

Let C be a category with cofibrations and let $S_n C$ be a category whose objects are functors $f: Ar[n] \to C$ such that, for $i \le j \le k$, $f(i = i) = *$, $f(i \le j) \to f(i \le k)$ is a cofibration, and $f(j \le k)$ is the pushout of $f(i \le j) \to f(i \le k)$ and $f(i \le j) \to f(j = j) = *$. The category $S_n C$ defined in this manner is itself a category with cofibrations. One can therefore iterate the construction, forming the sequence$S^{(m)}C = S \cdots SC$. This sequence is a spectrum called the K-theory spectrum of C.

== The additivity theorem ==
Most basic properties of algebraic K-theory of categories are consequences of the following important theorem. There are versions of it in all available settings. Here's a statement for Waldhausen categories. Notably, it's used to show that the sequence of spaces obtained by the iterated S-construction is an Ω-spectrum.

Let C be a Waldhausen category. The category of extensions $\mathcal{E}(C)$ has as objects the sequences $A \rightarrowtail B \twoheadrightarrow A'$ in C, where the first map is a cofibration, and $B \twoheadrightarrow A'$ is a quotient map, i.e. a pushout of the first one along the zero map A → 0. This category has a natural Waldhausen structure, and the forgetful functor $[ A \rightarrowtail B \twoheadrightarrow A' ] \mapsto (A, A')$ from $\mathcal{E}(C)$ to C × C respects it. The additivity theorem says that the induced map on K-theory spaces $K(\mathcal{E}(C)) \to K(C) \times K(C)$ is a homotopy equivalence.

For dg-categories the statement is similar. Let C be a small pretriangulated dg-category with a semiorthogonal decomposition $C \cong \langle C_1, C_2 \rangle$. Then the map of K-theory spectra K(C) → K(C_{1}) ⊕ K(C_{2}) is a homotopy equivalence. In fact, K-theory is a universal functor satisfying this additivity property and Morita invariance.

== Category of finite sets ==
Consider the category of pointed finite sets. This category has an object $k_+ = \{0, 1, \ldots, k\}$ for every natural number k, and the morphisms in this category are the functions $f : m_+ \to n_+$ which preserve the zero element. A theorem of Barratt, Priddy and Quillen says that the algebraic K-theory of this category is a sphere spectrum.

== Miscellaneous ==
More generally in abstract category theory, the K-theory of a category is a type of decategorification in which a set is created from an equivalence class of objects in a stable (∞,1)-category, where the elements of the set inherit an Abelian group structure from the exact sequences in the category.

=== Group completion method ===
The Grothendieck group construction is a functor from the category of rings to the category of abelian groups. The higher K-theory should then be a functor from the category of rings but to the category of higher objects such as simplicial abelian groups.

=== Topological Hochschild homology ===
Waldhausen introduced the idea of a trace map from the algebraic K-theory of a ring to its Hochschild homology; by way of this map, information can be obtained about the K-theory from the Hochschild homology. Bökstedt factorized this trace map, leading to the idea of a functor known as the topological Hochschild homology of the ring's Eilenberg–MacLane spectrum.

=== K-theory of a simplicial ring ===
If R is a constant simplicial ring, then this is the same thing as K-theory of a ring.

== See also ==
- Volodin space
- Cotriple homology
