= Matsumoto's theorem =

In mathematics, Matsumotos's theorem, named for Hideya Matsumoto, may refer to:

- Matsumoto's theorem (group theory)
- Matsumoto's theorem (K-theory)
