= Rigidity (mathematics) =

Property of mathematical objects

In mathematics, a rigid collection C of mathematical objects c (for instance sets or functions) is one in which every c ∈ C is uniquely determined by less information about c than one would expect. The above statement does not define a mathematical property; instead, it describes in what sense the adjective "rigid" is typically used in mathematics, by mathematicians.

== Examples ==
Some examples include:

1. Harmonic functions on the unit disk are rigid in the sense that they are uniquely determined by their boundary values.
2. Holomorphic functions are determined by the set of all derivatives at a single point. A smooth function from the real line to the complex plane is not, in general, determined by all its derivatives at a single point, but it is if we require additionally that it be possible to extend the function to one on a neighbourhood of the real line in the complex plane. The Schwarz lemma is an example of such a rigidity theorem.
3. By the fundamental theorem of algebra, polynomials in C are rigid in the sense that any polynomial is completely determined by its values on any infinite set, say N, or the unit disk. By the previous example, a polynomial is also determined within the set of holomorphic functions by the finite set of its non-zero derivatives at any single point.
4. Linear maps L(X, Y) between vector spaces X, Y are rigid in the sense that any L ∈ L(X, Y) is completely determined by its values on any set of basis vectors of X.
5. Mostow's rigidity theorem, which states that the geometric structure of negatively curved manifolds is determined by their topological structure.
6. A well-ordered set is rigid in the sense that the only (order-preserving) automorphism on it is the identity function. Consequently, an isomorphism between two given well-ordered sets will be unique.
7. Cauchy's theorem on geometry of convex polytopes states that a convex polytope is uniquely determined by the geometry of its faces and combinatorial adjacency rules.
8. Alexandrov's uniqueness theorem states that a convex polyhedron in three dimensions is uniquely determined by the metric space of geodesics on its surface.
9. Rigidity results in K-theory show isomorphisms between various algebraic K-theory groups.
10. Rigid groups in the inverse Galois problem.

== Combinatorial use ==
In combinatorics, the term rigid is also used to define the notion of a rigid surjection, which is a surjection $f: n \to m$ for which the following equivalent conditions hold:

1. For every $i, j \in m$, $i < j \implies \min f^{-1}(i) < \min f^{-1}(j)$;
2. Considering $f$ as an $n$-tuple $\big( f(0), f(1), \ldots, f(n-1) \big)$, the first occurrences of the elements in $m$ are in increasing order;
3. $f$ maps initial segments of $n$ to initial segments of $m$.

This relates to the above definition of rigid, in that each rigid surjection $f$ uniquely defines, and is uniquely defined by, a partition of $n$ into $m$ pieces. Given a rigid surjection $f$, the partition is defined by $n = f^{-1}(0) \sqcup \cdots \sqcup f^{-1}(m-1)$. Conversely, given a partition of $n = A_0 \sqcup \cdots \sqcup A_{m-1}$, order the $A_i$ by letting $A_i \prec A_j \iff \min A_i < \min A_j$. If $n = B_0 \sqcup \cdots \sqcup B_{m-1}$ is now the $\prec$-ordered partition, the function $f: n \to m$ defined by $f(i) = j \iff i \in B_j$ is a rigid surjection.

== See also ==
- Uniqueness theorem
- Structural rigidity, a mathematical theory describing the degrees of freedom of ensembles of rigid physical objects connected together by flexible hinges.
- Level structure (algebraic geometry)
