= Fundamental theorem of algebraic K-theory =

On the effects of changing the ring of K-groups

In algebraic K-theory, the fundamental theorem of algebraic K-theory describes the behavior of algebraic K-groups under passage from a ring to a polynomial ring or a Laurent polynomial ring. The theorem establishes homotopy invariance for the K-theory of suitable regular rings and gives a decomposition of the K-groups of Laurent polynomial extensions.

The fundamental theorem was first established in low degrees by Hyman Bass and subsequently extended to higher algebraic K-groups by Daniel Quillen. Related generalizations for arbitrary rings are expressed by the Bass–Heller–Swan theorem.

The theorem is particularly important in the study of algebraic K-theory, G-theory, regular rings, and the relationship between algebraic and geometric constructions.

For a regular noetherian ring $R$, its principal consequences are the natural isomorphisms

$$K_i(R[t])\cong K_i(R)$$

and

$$K_i(R[t,t^{-1}])
\cong
K_i(R)\oplus K_{i-1}(R),$$

for $i\geq1$.

In degree zero, the Laurent polynomial formula takes the form

$$K_0(R[t,t^{-1}])\cong K_0(R).$$

The corresponding results for the G-theory of noetherian rings do not require regularity.

== Algebraic K-theory ==
=== Exact categories ===
Let $\mathcal E$ be an exact category.

Quillen's Q-construction associates to $\mathcal E$ a category

$$Q\mathcal E$$

whose morphisms are represented by diagrams involving admissible monomorphisms and admissible epimorphisms.

More precisely, a morphism from $M$ to $N$ is represented by a diagram

$$\begin{array}{ccccc}
&&P&&\\
&\swarrow&&\searrow&\\
M&&&&N,
\end{array}$$

where the map $P\to M$ is an admissible epimorphism and the map $P\to N$ is an admissible monomorphism.

Composition is defined using pullbacks.

The K-groups of the exact category are defined by

$$K_i(\mathcal E)
=
\pi_{i+1}(BQ\mathcal E),$$

for $i\geq0$, where $BQ\mathcal E$ denotes the classifying space of the Q-construction.

=== K-theory of a ring ===
Let $R$ be a ring.

Denote by $\mathcal P(R)$ the exact category of finitely generated projective $R$-modules.

The algebraic K-groups of $R$ are

$$K_i(R)=K_i(\mathcal P(R)).$$

In particular, $K_0(R)$ is the Grothendieck group of finitely generated projective modules.

It is generated by symbols $[P]$ subject to the relations

$$[P\oplus Q]=[P]+[Q].$$

For a commutative ring, $K_1(R)$ can be described through the stable general linear group:

$$K_1(R)=GL(R)/E(R),$$

where $E(R)$ is the stable elementary subgroup.

Higher K-groups are constructed using homotopy-theoretic methods.

== G-theory ==
Let $R$ be a noetherian ring.

Denote by $\mathcal M(R)$ the exact category of finitely generated $R$-modules.

The G-groups of $R$ are defined by

$$G_i(R)=K_i(\mathcal M(R)).$$

The inclusion

$$\mathcal P(R)\hookrightarrow\mathcal M(R)$$

induces a natural homomorphism

$$K_i(R)\longrightarrow G_i(R).$$

The distinction between K-theory and G-theory is important for singular rings.

For a regular noetherian ring, the resolution theorem gives a natural isomorphism

$$K_i(R)\cong G_i(R).$$

For singular rings, this comparison need not be an isomorphism.

== The resolution theorem ==
The resolution theorem compares the K-theory of an exact category with that of a suitable exact subcategory whose objects provide finite resolutions.

In the case of a regular noetherian ring $R$, every finitely generated module admits a finite resolution by finitely generated projective modules:

$$0\longrightarrow P_n
\longrightarrow P_{n-1}
\longrightarrow\cdots
\longrightarrow P_0
\longrightarrow M
\longrightarrow0.$$

Here each $P_j$ is a finitely generated projective $R$-module.

The resolution theorem implies that the inclusion of projective modules into finitely generated modules induces an equivalence on the associated K-theory spaces.

Consequently,

$$K_i(R)\cong G_i(R)$$

for every $i\geq0$.

This result allows the fundamental theorem for G-theory to be applied to ordinary K-theory when the ring is regular and noetherian.

== Statement of the fundamental theorem ==
Let $R$ be a noetherian ring.

The fundamental theorem for G-theory gives the following natural isomorphisms.

=== Polynomial extension ===
For every $i\geq0$,

$$G_i(R[t])\cong G_i(R).$$

The isomorphism is induced by extension of scalars along the inclusion

$$R\longrightarrow R[t].$$

=== Laurent polynomial extension ===
For every $i\geq1$,

$$G_i(R[t,t^{-1}])
\cong
G_i(R)\oplus G_{i-1}(R).$$

In degree zero,

$$G_0(R[t,t^{-1}])\cong G_0(R).$$

Equivalently, the Laurent polynomial formula holds for all nonnegative degrees if one adopts the convention that negative G-groups vanish.

For a regular noetherian ring, the resolution theorem identifies these statements with the corresponding formulas for ordinary algebraic K-theory.

== Homotopy invariance ==
The polynomial extension theorem is commonly called homotopy invariance.

Let

$$\iota:R\longrightarrow R[t]$$

be the canonical inclusion.

Evaluation at zero defines a ring homomorphism

$$\varepsilon_0:R[t]\longrightarrow R,
\qquad
f(t)\longmapsto f(0).$$

The composition satisfies

$$\varepsilon_0\circ\iota
=
\operatorname{id}_R.$$

Therefore, on K-groups,

$$(\varepsilon_0)_*\circ\iota_*
=
\operatorname{id}_{K_i(R)}.$$

For a regular noetherian ring, homotopy invariance states that $\iota_*$ is an isomorphism.

Consequently,

$$\iota_*\circ(\varepsilon_0)_*
=
\operatorname{id}_{K_i(R[t])}.$$

The corresponding maps may be represented by

$$\begin{array}{ccccc}
K_i(R)&\xrightarrow{\ \iota_*\ }&K_i(R[t])\\
&\xleftarrow{\ (\varepsilon_0)_*\ }&
\end{array}$$

where the arrows are inverse isomorphisms under the regularity hypothesis.

=== Several polynomial variables ===
By repeatedly applying homotopy invariance, one obtains

$$K_i(R[t_1,\ldots,t_n])
\cong
K_i(R)$$

for every $n\geq1$ and every $i\geq0$, provided that $R$ is regular noetherian.

The analogous statement holds for G-theory of noetherian rings.

== Localization and the Laurent polynomial ring ==
The Laurent polynomial ring is obtained by inverting the polynomial variable:

$$R[t,t^{-1}]
=
R[t][t^{-1}].$$

Geometrically, for a commutative ring $R$, this corresponds to the open immersion

$$\operatorname{Spec}(R[t,t^{-1}])
\hookrightarrow
\operatorname{Spec}(R[t]).$$

Its complement is the closed subscheme defined by $t=0$, which is isomorphic to $\operatorname{Spec}(R)$.

The geometric configuration is

$$\begin{array}{ccccc}
\operatorname{Spec}(R)
&\longrightarrow&
\operatorname{Spec}(R[t])
&\longleftarrow&
\operatorname{Spec}(R[t,t^{-1}]).
\end{array}$$

The left morphism is a closed immersion and the right morphism is an open immersion.

Quillen's localization theorem provides a long exact sequence in G-theory:

$$\begin{aligned}
\cdots\longrightarrow&
G_i(R)
\longrightarrow
G_i(R[t])\\
\longrightarrow&
G_i(R[t,t^{-1}])
\xrightarrow{\ \partial\ }
G_{i-1}(R)\\
\longrightarrow&
G_{i-1}(R[t])
\longrightarrow\cdots.
\end{aligned}$$

The connecting homomorphism

$$\partial:
G_i(R[t,t^{-1}])
\longrightarrow
G_{i-1}(R)$$

is the boundary map associated with localization.

== Proof of the polynomial extension theorem ==
The polynomial extension theorem for G-theory can be established using the homotopy invariance theorem for coherent G-theory.

Let $R$ be noetherian.

The projection

$$\pi:\operatorname{Spec}(R[t])
\longrightarrow
\operatorname{Spec}(R)$$

is the projection of the affine line over $\operatorname{Spec}(R)$.

The pullback of finitely generated modules is given by

$$M\longmapsto M\otimes_R R[t].$$

Since $R[t]$ is flat over $R$, this defines an exact functor on finitely generated modules.

The homotopy invariance theorem for G-theory states that the induced map

$$\pi^*:G_i(R)\longrightarrow G_i(R[t])$$

is an isomorphism.

In the regular noetherian case, the resolution theorem gives

$$K_i(R)\cong G_i(R)$$

and

$$K_i(R[t])\cong G_i(R[t]).$$

The second comparison holds because a polynomial algebra over a regular noetherian ring is again regular noetherian.

Therefore,

$$K_i(R[t])\cong K_i(R).$$

This establishes the polynomial extension statement for ordinary algebraic K-theory under the regularity hypothesis.

== Proof of the Laurent polynomial decomposition ==
Let $R$ be noetherian.

Consider the localization sequence

$$\begin{aligned}
\cdots\longrightarrow&
G_i(R)
\xrightarrow{\ j_*\ }
G_i(R[t])\\
\xrightarrow{\ \rho\ }&
G_i(R[t,t^{-1}])
\xrightarrow{\ \partial\ }
G_{i-1}(R)\\
\xrightarrow{\ j_*\ }&
G_{i-1}(R[t])
\longrightarrow\cdots.
\end{aligned}$$

Here $j_*$ denotes the map induced by the closed immersion defined by $t=0$.

=== Vanishing of the closed-immersion map ===
The closed immersion has a trivial normal line bundle.

The self-intersection formula identifies the composition of the closed-immersion pushforward and the pullback along the affine-line projection with multiplication by the K-theoretic Euler class

$$\lambda_{-1}(\mathcal O_R)
=
1-[\mathcal O_R].$$

Since

$$1-[\mathcal O_R]=0$$

in $K_0(R)$, the corresponding self-intersection operation vanishes.

Homotopy invariance identifies $G_i(R[t])$ with $G_i(R)$.

It follows that the closed-immersion homomorphism

$$j_*:G_i(R)\longrightarrow G_i(R[t])$$

is zero.

=== The resulting short exact sequence ===
The localization sequence therefore reduces to

$$0\longrightarrow
G_i(R[t])
\xrightarrow{\ \rho\ }
G_i(R[t,t^{-1}])
\xrightarrow{\ \partial\ }
G_{i-1}(R)
\longrightarrow0.$$

Using homotopy invariance,

$$G_i(R[t])\cong G_i(R),$$

one obtains

$$0\longrightarrow
G_i(R)
\longrightarrow
G_i(R[t,t^{-1}])
\longrightarrow
G_{i-1}(R)
\longrightarrow0.$$

=== Splitting ===
The Laurent polynomial variable $t$ is invertible in $R[t,t^{-1}]$.

It therefore defines a class

$$[t]\in K_1(R[t,t^{-1}]).$$

For $x\in G_{i-1}(R)$, define a splitting map using the exterior product with $[t]$:

$$s(x)=x\smile[t].$$

The boundary map satisfies

$$\partial(s(x))=x,$$

with the standard choice of boundary and product conventions.

Thus $s$ is a right inverse of $\partial$.

The short exact sequence splits, giving

$$G_i(R[t,t^{-1}])
\cong
G_i(R)\oplus G_{i-1}(R).$$

For regular noetherian rings, the same decomposition holds in ordinary K-theory.

== The Bass–Heller–Swan decomposition ==
For arbitrary rings, the Laurent polynomial extension can contain additional K-theoretic information not detected by the regular-ring fundamental theorem.

These additional contributions are described by the Bass Nil-groups.

For a ring $R$, define

$$NK_i(R)
=
\ker\left(
K_i(R[t])
\xrightarrow{\ t\mapsto0\ }
K_i(R)
\right).$$

The Bass–Heller–Swan decomposition, in its nonconnective K-theoretic form, gives

$$\begin{aligned}
K_i(R[t,t^{-1}])
\cong\;&K_i(R)\oplus K_{i-1}(R)\\
&\oplus NK_i(R)\oplus NK_i(R).
\end{aligned}$$

For regular noetherian rings, homotopy invariance implies

$$NK_i(R)=0.$$

Consequently, the decomposition reduces to

$$K_i(R[t,t^{-1}])
\cong
K_i(R)\oplus K_{i-1}(R).$$

The Nil-groups therefore measure a failure of polynomial homotopy invariance for general rings.

== Natural transformations and functoriality ==
The fundamental theorem is natural with respect to ring homomorphisms.

Let

$$f:R\longrightarrow S$$

be a homomorphism of regular noetherian rings.

It induces

$$f[t]:R[t]\longrightarrow S[t]$$

and

$$f[t,t^{-1}]:
R[t,t^{-1}]
\longrightarrow S[t,t^{-1}].$$

The polynomial extension isomorphisms fit into a commutative diagram

$$\begin{array}{ccc}
K_i(R)&\longrightarrow&K_i(R[t])\\
\downarrow f_*&&\downarrow f[t]_*\\
K_i(S)&\longrightarrow&K_i(S[t]).
\end{array}$$

The horizontal maps are induced by the canonical inclusions.

Similarly, the Laurent polynomial decompositions are compatible with the induced maps on K-groups.

Thus the theorem gives natural isomorphisms of functors on the category of regular noetherian rings.

== Example: A field ==
Let $F$ be a field.

Since every field is regular noetherian, the fundamental theorem applies.

For polynomial rings,

$$K_i(F[t])\cong K_i(F).$$

For Laurent polynomial rings,

$$K_i(F[t,t^{-1}])
\cong
K_i(F)\oplus K_{i-1}(F)$$

for $i\geq1$.

In degree zero,

$$K_0(F)\cong\mathbb Z.$$

Therefore,

$$K_0(F[t,t^{-1}])\cong\mathbb Z.$$

In degree one,

$$K_1(F)\cong F^\times.$$

Consequently,

$$K_1(F[t,t^{-1}])
\cong
F^\times\oplus\mathbb Z.$$

This agrees with the fact that the units of the Laurent polynomial ring are precisely

$$F[t,t^{-1}]^\times
=
\{at^n:a\in F^\times,\ n\in\mathbb Z\}.$$

The integer summand records the exponent of the Laurent polynomial variable.

== Example: Several Laurent variables ==
Let $R$ be a regular noetherian ring.

Consider

$$R[t_1^{\pm1},\ldots,t_n^{\pm1}].$$

Repeated application of the fundamental theorem yields

$$K_i(R[t_1^{\pm1},\ldots,t_n^{\pm1}])
\cong
\bigoplus_{j=0}^{n}
\binom nj K_{i-j}(R),$$

where negative K-groups vanish for regular noetherian rings.

For example, with two Laurent variables,

$$\begin{aligned}
K_i(R[t_1^{\pm1},t_2^{\pm1}])
\cong\;&K_i(R)\\
&\oplus K_{i-1}(R)^{\oplus2}\\
&\oplus K_{i-2}(R).
\end{aligned}$$

The binomial coefficients arise from repeatedly decomposing the K-theory of a Laurent polynomial extension.

== Relationship with algebraic geometry ==
For a regular noetherian scheme $X$, the affine-line projection

$$\mathbb A_X^1\longrightarrow X$$

induces an isomorphism in algebraic K-theory.

This is the geometric form of polynomial homotopy invariance.

Likewise, the multiplicative group scheme

$$\mathbb G_{m,X}
=
X\times\operatorname{Spec}(\mathbb Z[t,t^{-1}])$$

corresponds to adjoining an invertible polynomial variable.

The fundamental theorem therefore gives

$$K_i(\mathbb G_{m,X})
\cong
K_i(X)\oplus K_{i-1}(X)$$

under the appropriate regularity hypotheses.

The decomposition is an algebraic analogue of suspension-type decompositions appearing in topological K-theory.

== See also ==
- Algebraic K-theory
- Bass–Heller–Swan theorem
- G-theory
- Quillen's Q-construction
- Localization theorem (algebraic K-theory)
- Resolution theorem (algebraic K-theory)
- Regular ring
- Laurent polynomial
- Homotopy invariance
- K-theory

== See also ==
- Basic theorems in algebraic K-theory
