= Karoubi =

Karoubi may refer to:

- Max Karoubi Mathematician who introduced:
  - Karoubi conjecture
  - Karoubi envelope
- Mehdi Karroubi Iranian politician
