= Bloch's formula =

Result in algebraic K-theory relating Chow groups to cohomology

In algebraic K-theory, a branch of mathematics, Bloch's formula, introduced by Spencer Bloch for $K_2$, states that the Chow group of a smooth variety X over a field is isomorphic to the cohomology of X with coefficients in the K-theory of the structure sheaf $\mathcal{O}_X$; that is,

$$\operatorname{CH}^q(X) = \operatorname{H}^q(X, K_q(\mathcal{O}_X))$$

where the right-hand side is the sheaf cohomology; $K_q(\mathcal{O}_X)$ is the sheaf associated to the presheaf $U \mapsto K_q(U)$, U Zariski open subsets of X. The general case is due to Quillen. For q = 1, one recovers $\operatorname{Pic}(X) = H^1(X, \mathcal{O}_X^*)$. (see also Picard group.)

The formula for the mixed characteristic is still open.

== See also ==
- Additive K-theory
