= Volodin space =

Topological space

In mathematics, more specifically in topology, the Volodin space $X$ of a ring R is a subspace of the classifying space $BGL(R)$ given by

$$X = \bigcup_{n, \sigma} B(U_n(R)^\sigma)$$

where $U_n(R) \subset GL_n(R)$ is the subgroup of upper triangular matrices with 1's on the diagonal (i.e., the unipotent radical of the standard Borel) and $\sigma$ a permutation matrix thought of as an element in $GL_n(R)$ and acting (superscript) by conjugation. The space is acyclic and the fundamental group $\pi_1 X$ is the Steinberg group $\operatorname{St}(R)$ of R. In fact, Suslin (1981) showed that X yields a model for Quillen's plus-construction $BGL(R)/X \simeq BGL^+(R)$ in algebraic K-theory.

== Application ==
An analogue of Volodin's space where GL(R) is replaced by the Lie algebra $\mathfrak{gl}(R)$ was used by Goodwillie (1986) to prove that, after tensoring with Q, relative K-theory K(A, I), for a nilpotent ideal I, is isomorphic to relative cyclic homology HC(A, I). This theorem was a pioneering result in the area of trace methods.
