= Bloch group =

In mathematics, the Bloch group is a cohomology group of the Bloch–Suslin complex, named after Spencer Bloch and Andrei Suslin. It is closely related to polylogarithm, hyperbolic geometry and algebraic K-theory.

== Bloch–Wigner function ==
The dilogarithm function is the function defined by the power series

$$\operatorname{Li}_2(z) = \sum_{k=1}^\infty {z^k \over k^2}.$$

It can be extended by analytic continuation, where the path of integration avoids the cut from 1 to +∞

$$\operatorname{Li}_2 (z) = -\int_0^z{\log (1-t) \over t} \,\mathrm{d}t.$$

The Bloch–Wigner function is related to dilogarithm function by

$\operatorname{D}_2 (z) = \operatorname{Im} (\operatorname{Li}_2 (z) )+\arg(1-z)\log|z|$, if $z \in \mathbb{C} \setminus \{0, 1\}.$

This function enjoys several remarkable properties, e.g.

- $\operatorname{D}_2 (z)$ is real analytic on $\mathbb{C} \setminus \{0, 1\}.$
- $\operatorname{D}_2 (z) = \operatorname{D}_2 \left(1-\frac{1}{z}\right) = \operatorname{D}_2 \left(\frac{1}{1-z}\right) = - \operatorname{D}_2 \left(\frac{1}{z}\right) = -\operatorname{D}_2 (1-z) = -\operatorname{D}_2 \left(\frac{-z}{1-z}\right).$
- $\operatorname{D}_2 (x) + \operatorname{D}_2 (y) + \operatorname{D}_2 \left(\frac{1-x}{1-xy}\right) + \operatorname{D}_2 (1-xy) + \operatorname{D}_2 \left(\frac{1-y}{1-xy}\right) = 0.$

The last equation is a variant of Abel's functional equation for the dilogarithm (Abel 1881).

== Definition ==
Let K be a field and define $\mathbb{Z} (K) = \mathbb{Z} [K \setminus \{0, 1\}]$ as the free abelian group generated by symbols [x]. Abel's functional equation implies that D_{2} vanishes on the subgroup D(K) of Z(K) generated by elements

$$[x] + [y] + \left[\frac{1-x}{1-xy}\right] + [1-xy] + \left[\frac{1-y}{1-xy}\right]$$

Denote by A (K) the quotient of $\mathbb{Z} (K)$ by the subgroup D(K). The Bloch-Suslin complex is defined as the following cochain complex, concentrated in degrees one and two

$\operatorname{B}^\bullet: A(K) \stackrel{d}{\longrightarrow} \wedge^2 K^*$, where $d [x] = x \wedge (1-x)$,

then the Bloch group was defined by Bloch (Bloch 1978)

$$\operatorname{B}_2(K) = \operatorname{H}^1(\operatorname{Spec}(K), \operatorname{B}^\bullet)$$

The Bloch–Suslin complex can be extended to be an exact sequence

$$0 \longrightarrow \operatorname{B}_2(K) \longrightarrow A(K) \stackrel{d}{\longrightarrow} \wedge^2 K^* \longrightarrow \operatorname{K}_2(K) \longrightarrow 0$$

This assertion is due to the Matsumoto theorem on K_{2} for fields.

== Relations between K_{3} and the Bloch group ==
If c denotes the element $[x] + [1-x] \in \operatorname{B}_2(K)$ and the field is infinite, Suslin proved (Suslin 1990) the element c does not depend on the choice of x, and

$$\operatorname{coker}(\pi_3(\operatorname{BGM}(K)^+) \rightarrow \operatorname{K}_3(K)) = \operatorname{B}_2(K)/2c$$

where GM(K) is the subgroup of GL(K), consisting of monomial matrices, and BGM(K)^{+} is the Quillen's plus-construction. Moreover, let K_{3}^{M} denote the Milnor's K-group, then there exists an exact sequence

$$0 \rightarrow \operatorname{Tor}(K^*, K^*)^{\sim} \rightarrow \operatorname{K}_3(K)_{ind} \rightarrow \operatorname{B}_2(K) \rightarrow 0$$

where K_{3}(K)_{ind} = coker(K_{3}^{M}(K) → K_{3}(K)) and Tor(K^{*}, K^{*})^{~} is the unique nontrivial extension of Tor(K^{*}, K^{*}) by means of Z/2.

== Relations to hyperbolic geometry in three-dimensions ==
The Bloch-Wigner function $D_{2}(z)$ , which is defined on $\mathbb{C}\setminus\{0,1\}=\mathbb{C}P^{1}\setminus\{0,1,\infty\}$ , has the following meaning: Let $\mathbb{H}^{3}$ be 3-dimensional hyperbolic space and $\mathbb{H}^{3}=\mathbb{C}\times\mathbb{R}_{>0}$ its half space model. One can regard elements of $\mathbb{C}\cup\{\infty\}=\mathbb{C}P^{1}$ as points at infinity on $\mathbb{H}^{3}$. A tetrahedron, all of whose vertices are at infinity, is called an ideal tetrahedron. We denote such a tetrahedron by $(p_{0},p_{1},p_{2},p_{3})$ and its (signed) volume by $\left\langle p_{0},p_{1},p_{2},p_{3}\right\rangle$ where $p_{0},\ldots,p_{3}\in\mathbb{C}P^{1}$ are the vertices. Then under the appropriate metric up to constants we can obtain its cross-ratio:

$$\left\langle p_{0},p_{1},p_{2},p_{3}\right\rangle =D_{2}\left(\frac{(p_{0}-p_{2})(p_{1}-p_{3})}{(p_{0}-p_{1})(p_{2}-p_{3})}\right)\ .$$

In particular, $D_{2}(z)=\left\langle 0,1,z,\infty\right\rangle$ . Due to the five terms relation of $D_{2}(z)$ , the volume of the boundary of non-degenerate ideal tetrahedron $(p_{0},p_{1},p_{2},p_{3},p_{4})$ equals 0 if and only if

$$\left\langle \partial(p_{0},p_{1},p_{2},p_{3},p_{4})\right\rangle =\sum_{i=0}^{4}(-1)^{i}\left\langle p_{0},..,\hat{p}_{i},..,p_{4}\right\rangle =0\ .$$

In addition, given a hyperbolic manifold $X=\mathbb{H}^{3}/\Gamma$ , one can decompose

$$X=\bigcup^n_{j=1}\Delta(z_j)$$

where the $\Delta(z_j)$ are ideal tetrahedra. whose all vertices are at infinity on $\partial\mathbb{H}^3$ . Here the $z_j$ are certain complex numbers with $\text{Im}\ z>0$ . Each ideal tetrahedron is isometric to one with its vertices at $0, 1, z, \infty$ for some $z$ with $\text{Im}\ z>0$ . Here $z$ is the cross-ratio of the vertices of the tetrahedron. Thus the volume of the tetrahedron depends only one single parameter $z$ . (Neumann & Zagier 1985) showed that for ideal tetrahedron $\Delta$ , $vol(\Delta(z))=D_{2}(z)$ where $D_{2}(z)$ is the Bloch-Wigner dilogarithm. For general hyperbolic 3-manifold one obtains

$$vol(X)=\sum^n_{j=1} D_{2}(z)$$

by gluing them. The Mostow rigidity theorem guarantees only single value of the volume with $\text{Im}\ z_j>0$ for all $j$ .

== Generalizations ==
Via substituting dilogarithm by trilogarithm or even higher polylogarithms, the notion of Bloch group was extended by Goncharov (Goncharov 1991) and Zagier (Zagier 1990). It is widely conjectured that those generalized Bloch groups B_{n} should be related to algebraic K-theory or motivic cohomology. There are also generalizations of the Bloch group in other directions, for example, the extended Bloch group defined by Neumann (Neumann 2004).
