= Parshin's conjecture =

In mathematics, more specifically in algebraic geometry, Parshin's conjecture (also referred to as the Beilinson–Parshin conjecture) states that for any smooth projective variety X defined over a finite field, the higher algebraic K-groups vanish up to torsion:

$$K_i(X) \otimes \mathbf Q = 0, \ \, i > 0.$$

It is named after Aleksei Nikolaevich Parshin and Alexander Beilinson.

== Finite fields ==
The conjecture holds if $dim\ X = 0$ by Quillen's computation of the K-groups of finite fields, showing in particular that they are finite groups.

== Curves ==
The conjecture holds if $dim\ X = 1$ by the proof of Corollary 3.2.3 of Harder. Additionally, by Quillen's finite generation result (proving the Bass conjecture for the K-groups in this case) it follows that the K-groups are finite if $dim\ X = 1$.
