= Aleksei Parshin =

Russian mathematician (1942–2022)

- Алексей Паршин
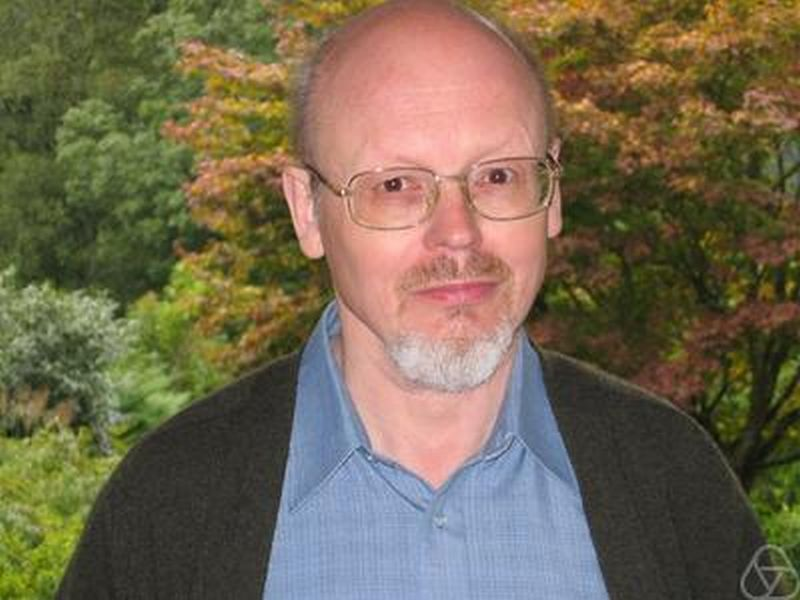
- Parshin in 2005
- Born: 7 November 1942; Sverdlovsk, Russian SFSR, Soviet Union
- Died: 18 June 2022 (aged 79); Moscow, Russian Federation
- Education: Steklov Institute of Mathematics
- Known for: Parshin chain; Parshin's conjecture; Parshin's trick
- Awards: Humboldt Prize (1996); Vinogradov Prize (2004); Chebyshev Gold Medal (2012)
- Scientific career
- Fields: Mathematics
- Workplaces: Moscow State University; Steklov Institute of Mathematics
- Thesis: Algebraic curves over function fields (1968)
- Doctoral advisor: Igor Shafarevich

Aleksei Nikolaevich Parshin (Note: His name is sometimes romanized as Alexey or Aleksey and Paršin.) (Russian: Алексей Николаевич Паршин; 7 November 1942 – 18 June 2022) was a Russian mathematician, specializing in arithmetic geometry. He is most well-known for his role in the proof of the Mordell conjecture.

== Education and career ==
Parshin entered the Faculty of Mathematics and Mechanics of Moscow State University in 1959 and graduated in 1964. He then enrolled as a graduate student at the Steklov Institute of Mathematics, where he received his Kand. Nauk (Ph.D.) in 1968 under Igor Shafarevich. In 1983, he received his Doctor Nauk (doctorate of sciences) from Moscow State University.

Parshin became a junior research fellow at the Steklov Institute of Mathematics in Moscow in 1968, later becoming a senior and leading research fellow. He became the head of its Department of Algebra in 1995. He also taught at Moscow State University.

== Research ==
In his 1968 thesis, Parshin proved that the Mordell conjecture is a logical consequence of Shafarevich's finiteness conjecture concerning isomorphism classes of abelian varieties via what is known as Parshin's trick, which gives an embedding of an algebraic curve into the Siegel modular variety. Shafarevich proved his finiteness conjecture for the case with genus g = 1. Parshin proved a special case (for S = the empty set) of the following theorem: If B is a smooth complex curve and S is a finite subset of B then there exist only finitely many families (up to isomorphism) of smooth curves of fixed genus g ≥ 2 over B \ S. The general case (for non-empty S) of the preceding theorem was proved by Suren Arakelov in 1971. At the same time, Parshin gave a new proof (without an application of the Shafarevich finiteness condition) of the Mordell conjecture in function fields (already proved by Yuri Manin in 1963 and by Hans Grauert in 1965). In 1983, Gerd Faltings completed the program and proved Shafarevich's finiteness conjecture, thereby proving the Mordell conjecture.

His other research dealt with generalizations of class field theory in higher dimensions, with integrable systems, and with the history of mathematics.

He was an editor for the Russian edition of the collected works of David Hilbert and was a co-editor, with V. I. Arnold, of selected works of Hermann Weyl.

== Personal life ==
Parshin was born on 7 November 1942 in Sverdlovsk and died on 18 June 2022.

Parshin was longtime friends with Russian philosopher Aleksei Losev and started the Russian philosophy seminar at the Dom Loseva Library in Moscow. Parshin was Orthodox Christian and wrote about the relationship between Russian religious philosophy and the modern sciences.

== Awards and honors ==
In 1971, Parshin received the Prize of the Moscow Mathematical Society for young mathematicians. He was awarded the Humboldt Prize in 1996. He received the Vinogradov Prize in 2004 and the Chebyshev Gold Medal in 2012 from the Russian Academy of Sciences.

The Université Paris-Nord granted Parshin an honorary doctorate in 2001. Parshin was elected a corresponding member of the Russian Academy of Sciences in 2006 and then a full member in 2011. He was elected a member of the Academia Europaea in 2017.

Parshin was an invited speaker at the 1970 International Congress of Mathematicians (ICM) with his talk titled Quelques conjectures de finitude en géométrie diophantienne. He was a plenary speaker at the 2010 ICM with his talk titled Representations of higher adelic groups and arithmetic.

== Selected publications ==
- Parshin, A. N. (2002). Путь. Математика и другие миры [The Way. Mathematics and Other Worlds] (in Russian). Moscow: Добросвет. ISBN 978-5-7913-0053-9. (Parshin's writings on Russian science and philosophy)
- with Shafarevich, Parshin edited several volumes in "Algebraic Geometry and Number Theory" in the Encyclopedia of Mathematical Sciences series published by Springer Verlag.
  - Parshin, A. N.; Shafarevich, I. R., eds. (1998). Algebraic Geometry III – Complex Algebraic Varieties Algebraic Curves and Their Jacobians. Encyclopaedia of Mathematical Sciences. Vol. 36. doi:10.1007/978-3-662-03662-4. ISBN 978-3-642-08118-7.
  - Parshin, A. N.; Shafarevich, I. R., eds. (1994). Algebraic Geometry IV – Linear Algebraic Groups Invariant Theory. Encyclopaedia of Mathematical Sciences. Vol. 55. doi:10.1007/978-3-662-03073-8. ISBN 978-3-642-08119-4.
  - Parshin, A. N.; Shafarevich, I. R., eds. (1999). Algebraic Geometry V – Fano Varieties. Vol. 47. Springer. ISBN 978-3-642-08260-3.
  - Parshin, A.vN.; Shafarevich, I. R., eds. (1998). Number Theory IV – Transcendental Numbers. Encyclopaedia of Mathematical Sciences. Vol. 44. doi:10.1007/978-3-662-03644-0. ISBN 978-3-662-03644-0.
- Parshin, A. N.; Shafarevich, I. R. (1986). "Arithmetic of algebraic varieties". Proceedings of the Steklov Institute of Mathematics. 168 (3): 75–99.
- with Yuri Zarin: Finiteness problems in algebraic geometry, in Eight papers translated from the Russian. American Mathematical Society Translations Ser. 2, Vol.143, 1989, pp. 35–102, revised version of the original published as an appendix in the Russian edition of Serge Lang Fundamentals of Diophantine Geometry (English version of the appendix Online)
- Parshin Numbers as functions. The development of an idea in the Moscow school of algebraic geometry, in Bolibruch, Osipov, Sinai (eds.) Mathematical Events of the Twentieth Century, Springer 2006, pp. 297–330
- Parshin Mathematik in Moskau – es war eine große Epoche, Mitteilungen DMV, Vol. 18, 2010, pp. 43–48
