= European Congress of Mathematics =

International mathematics conference

- Status: Active
- Genre: Mathematics conference
- Frequency: Quadrennial
- Years active: 34
- Inaugurated: July 6, 1992
- Previous event: 2024 (Seville)
- Next event: 2028 (Bologna)
- Website: ECM

The European Congress of Mathematics (ECM) is the second largest international conference of the mathematics community, after the International Congresses of Mathematicians (ICM).

The ECM are held every four years and are timed precisely between the ICM. The ECM is held under the auspices of the European Mathematical Society (EMS), and was one of its earliest initiatives. It was founded by Max Karoubi and the first edition took place in Paris in 1992.

Its objectives are "to present various new aspects of pure and applied mathematics to a wide audience, to be a forum for discussion of the relationship between mathematics and society in Europe, and to enhance cooperation among mathematicians from all European countries".

== Activities ==
The Congresses generally last a week and consist of plenary lectures, parallel (invited) lectures and several mini-symposia devoted to a particular subject, where participants can contribute with posters and short talks. Many editions featured also special lectures, e.g. by prize winners, and public sessions aimed at a general audience.

Other mathematics conferences and workshops organised in the same period become often satellite events of the ECM.

== Prizes ==
Several prizes are awarded at the beginning of the Congress:

- The EMS Prize (awarded since the first edition in 1992), to up to ten young mathematicians of European nationality or working in Europe
- The Felix Klein Prize (awarded since 2000), to at most three young applied mathematicians
- The Otto Neugebauer Prize (awarded since 2012) to a researcher in history of mathematics
- The EMS/ECMI Lánczos Prize for Mathematical Software (awarded since 2023), to a mathematician or scientist, or a group, for the development of outstanding mathematical software with important applications
- The Paul Lévy Prize in Probability Theory (awarded since 2023), to a scientist who has made outstanding contributions to Probability Theory and its Applications
