= K-groups of a field =

In mathematics, especially in algebraic K-theory, the algebraic K-group of a field is important to compute. For a finite field, the complete calculation was given by Daniel Quillen.

== Low degrees ==
The map sending a finite-dimensional F-vector space to its dimension induces an isomorphism

$$K_0(F) \cong \mathbf Z$$

for any field F. Next,

$$K_1(F) = F^\times,$$

the multiplicative group of F. The second K-group of a field is described in terms of generators and relations by Matsumoto's theorem.

== Finite fields ==
The K-groups of finite fields are one of the few cases where the K-theory is known completely: for $n \ge 1$,

$$K_n(\mathbb{F}_q) = \pi_n(BGL(\mathbb{F}_q)^+) \simeq
\begin{cases}
\mathbb{Z}/{(q^i - 1)}, & \text{if }n = 2i - 1 \\
0, & \text{if }n\text{ is even}
\end{cases}$$

For n=2, this can be seen from Matsumoto's theorem, in higher degrees it was computed by Quillen in conjunction with his work on the Adams conjecture. A different proof was given by Jardine (1993).

== Local and global fields ==
Weibel (2005) surveys the computations of K-theory of global fields (such as number fields and function fields), as well as local fields (such as p-adic numbers).

== Algebraically closed fields ==
Suslin (1983) showed that the torsion in K-theory is insensitive to extensions of algebraically closed fields. This statement is known as Suslin rigidity.

== See also ==
- divisor class group
