= Cotriple homology =

Concept in category theory

In algebra, given a category C with a cotriple, the n-th cotriple homology of an object X in C with coefficients in a functor E is the n-th homotopy group of the E of the augmented simplicial object induced from X by the cotriple. The term "homology" is because in the abelian case, by the Dold–Kan correspondence, the homotopy groups are the homology of the corresponding chain complex.

Example: Let N be a left module over a ring R and let $E=-\otimes_R N$. Let F be the left adjoint of the forgetful functor from the category of rings to Set; i.e., free module functor. Then $FU$ defines a cotriple and the n-th cotriple homology of $E(FU_*M)$ is the n-th left derived functor of E evaluated at M; i.e., $\operatorname{Tor}^R_n(M, N)$.

Example (algebraic K-theory): Let us write GL for the functor $R \mapsto \varinjlim_n GL_n(R)$. As before, $FU$ defines a cotriple on the category of rings with F free ring functor and U forgetful. For a ring R, one has:

$K_n(R) = \pi_{n-2} GL(FU_* R), \, n \ge 3$

where on the left is the n-th K-group of R. This example is an instance of nonabelian homological algebra.
