= Resolution theorem (algebraic K-theory) =

In algebraic K-theory, Quillen's resolution theorem states that if $\mathcal{A}\subset\mathcal{C}$ is an exact subcategory where $\mathcal{A}$ is an extension-closed subcategory of $\mathcal{C}$, which is also closed under taking kernels of admissible surjections, and has a finite resolution by objects in $\mathcal{A}$; then the inclusion $\mathcal{A} \rightarrow \mathcal{C}$ induces a homotopy equivalence of their K-theory spectra $K_0(\mathcal{A})\simeq~K_0(\mathcal{C})$.
