= Whitehead's lemma =

Whitehead's lemma is a technical result in abstract algebra used in algebraic K-theory. It states that a matrix of the form

$$\begin{bmatrix}
u & 0 \\
0 & u^{-1}
\end{bmatrix}$$

is equivalent to the identity matrix by elementary transformations (that is, transvections):

$$\begin{bmatrix}
u & 0 \\
0 & u^{-1} \end{bmatrix} = e_{21}(u^{-1}) e_{12}(1-u) e_{21}(-1) e_{12}(1-u^{-1}).$$

Here, $e_{ij}(s)$ indicates a matrix whose diagonal block is $1$ and $ij$-th entry is $s$.

The name "Whitehead's lemma" also refers to the closely related result that the derived group of the stable general linear group is the group generated by elementary matrices. In symbols,

$$\operatorname{E}(A) = [\operatorname{GL}(A),\operatorname{GL}(A)]$$.

This holds for the stable group (the direct limit of matrices of finite size) over any ring, but not in general for the unstable groups, even over a field. For instance for

$$\operatorname{GL}(2, \mathbb{Z}/2\mathbb{Z})$$

one has:

$$\operatorname{Alt}(3) \cong [\operatorname{GL}_2(\mathbb{Z}/2\mathbb{Z}),\operatorname{GL}_2(\mathbb{Z}/2\mathbb{Z})] < \operatorname{E}_2(\mathbb{Z}/2\mathbb{Z}) = \operatorname{SL}_2(\mathbb{Z}/2\mathbb{Z}) = \operatorname{GL}_2(\mathbb{Z}/2\mathbb{Z}) \cong \operatorname{Sym}(3),$$

where Alt(3) and Sym(3) denote the alternating resp. symmetric group on 3 letters.

== See also ==
- Special linear group#Relations to other subgroups of GL(n, A)
