= Cyclic homology =

In noncommutative geometry and related branches of mathematics, cyclic homology and cyclic cohomology are certain (co)homology theories for associative algebras which generalize the de Rham (co)homology of manifolds. These notions were independently introduced by Boris Tsygan (homology) and Alain Connes (cohomology) in the 1980s. These invariants have many interesting relationships with several older branches of mathematics, including de Rham theory, Hochschild (co)homology, group cohomology, and the K-theory. Contributors to the development of the theory include Max Karoubi, Yuri L. Daletskii, Boris Feigin, Jean-Luc Brylinski, Mariusz Wodzicki, Jean-Louis Loday, Victor Nistor, Daniel Quillen, Joachim Cuntz, Ryszard Nest, Ralf Meyer, and Michael Puschnigg.

== Hints about definition ==
The first definition of the cyclic homology of a ring A over a field of characteristic zero, denoted

HC_{n}(A) or H_{n}^{λ}(A),

proceeded by the means of the following explicit chain complex related to the Hochschild homology complex of A, called the Connes complex:

For any natural number n ≥ 0, define the operator $t_n$ which generates the natural cyclic action of $\mathbb{Z}/ n \mathbb{Z}$ on the n-th tensor product of A:

$$\begin{align}
t_n : A^{\otimes n} \to A^{\otimes n}, \quad a_1 \otimes \dots \otimes a_n \mapsto (-1)^{n-1} a_n \otimes a_1 \otimes \dots \otimes a_{n-1}.
\end{align}$$

Recall that the Hochschild complex groups of A with coefficients in A itself are given by setting $HC_n(A) := A^{\otimes n+1}$ for all n ≥ 0. Then the components of the Connes complex are defined as $C^\lambda_n(A) := HC_n(A)/ \langle 1 - t_{n+1} \rangle$, and the differential $d : C^\lambda_n(A) \to C^\lambda_{n-1}(A)$ is the restriction of the Hochschild differential to this quotient. One can check that the Hochschild differential does indeed factor through to this space of coinvariants.

Connes later found a more categorical approach to cyclic homology using a notion of cyclic object in an abelian category, which is analogous to the notion of simplicial object. In this way, cyclic homology (and cohomology) may be interpreted as a derived functor, which can be explicitly computed by the means of the (b, B)-bicomplex. If the field k contains the rational numbers, the definition in terms of the Connes complex calculates the same homology.

One of the striking features of cyclic homology is the existence of a long exact sequence connecting Hochschild and cyclic homology. This long exact sequence is referred to as the periodicity sequence.

== Case of commutative rings ==
Cyclic cohomology of the commutative algebra A of regular functions on an affine algebraic variety over a field k of characteristic zero can be computed in terms of Grothendieck's algebraic de Rham complex. In particular, if the variety V=Spec A is smooth, cyclic cohomology of A are expressed in terms of the de Rham cohomology of V as follows:

$$HC_n(A)\simeq \Omega^n\!A/d\Omega^{n-1}\!A\oplus \bigoplus_{i\geq 1}H^{n-2i}_{\text{dR}}(V).$$

This formula suggests a way to define de Rham cohomology for a 'noncommutative spectrum' of a noncommutative algebra A, which was extensively developed by Connes.

== Variants of cyclic homology ==
One motivation of cyclic homology was the need for an approximation of K-theory that is defined, unlike K-theory, as the homology of a chain complex. Cyclic cohomology is in fact endowed with a pairing with K-theory, and one hopes this pairing to be non-degenerate.

There has been defined a number of variants whose purpose is to fit better with algebras with topology, such as Fréchet algebras, $C^*$-algebras, etc. The reason is that K-theory behaves much better on topological algebras such as Banach algebras or C*-algebras than on algebras without additional structure. Since, on the other hand, cyclic homology degenerates on C*-algebras, there came up the need to define modified theories. Among them are entire cyclic homology due to Alain Connes, analytic cyclic homology due to Ralf Meyer or asymptotic and local cyclic homology due to Michael Puschnigg. The last one is very close to K-theory as it is endowed with a bivariant Chern character from KK-theory.

== Applications ==
One of the applications of cyclic homology is to find new proofs and generalizations of the Atiyah-Singer index theorem. Among these generalizations are index theorems based on spectral triples and deformation quantization of Poisson structures.

An elliptic operator D on a compact smooth manifold defines a class in K homology. One invariant of this class is the analytic index of the operator. This is seen as the pairing of the class [D], with the element 1 in HC(C(M)). Cyclic cohomology can be seen as a way to get higher invariants of elliptic differential operators not only for smooth manifolds, but also for foliations, orbifolds, and singular spaces that appear in noncommutative geometry.

== Computations of algebraic K-theory ==
The cyclotomic trace map is a map from algebraic K-theory (of a ring A, say), to cyclic homology:

$${\rm tr}: K_n (A) \to HC_{n-1} (A).$$

In some situations, this map can be used to compute K-theory by means of this map. A pioneering result in this direction is a theorem of Goodwillie (1986): it asserts that the map

$$K_n(A, I) \otimes \mathbf Q \to HC_{n-1} (A, I) \otimes \mathbf Q$$

between the relative K-theory of A with respect to a nilpotent two-sided ideal I to the relative cyclic homology (measuring the difference between K-theory or cyclic homology of A and of A/I) is an isomorphism for n≥1.

While Goodwillie's result holds for arbitrary rings, a quick reduction shows that it is in essence only a statement about $A \otimes_{\mathbf Z} \mathbf Q$. For rings not containing Q, cyclic homology must be replaced by topological cyclic homology in order to keep a close connection to K-theory. (If Q is contained in A, then cyclic homology and topological cyclic homology of A agree.) This is in line with the fact that (classical) Hochschild homology is less well-behaved than topological Hochschild homology for rings not containing Q. Clausen, Mathew & Morrow (2018) proved a far-reaching generalization of Goodwillie's result, stating that for a commutative ring A so that the Henselian lemma holds with respect to the ideal I, the relative K-theory is isomorphic to relative topological cyclic homology (without tensoring both with Q). Their result also encompasses a theorem of Gabber (1992), asserting that in this situation the relative K-theory spectrum modulo an integer n which is invertible in A vanishes. Jardine (1993) used Gabber's result and Suslin rigidity to reprove Quillen's computation of the K-theory of finite fields.

== See also ==
- Noncommutative geometry
