= Equivariant algebraic K-theory =

In mathematics, the equivariant algebraic K-theory is an algebraic K-theory associated to the category $\operatorname{Coh}^G(X)$ of equivariant coherent sheaves on an algebraic scheme X with action of a linear algebraic group G, via Quillen's Q-construction; thus, by definition,

$$K_i^G(X) = \pi_i(B^+ \operatorname{Coh}^G(X)).$$

In particular, $K_0^G(C)$ is the Grothendieck group of $\operatorname{Coh}^G(X)$. The theory was developed by R. W. Thomason in 1980s. Specifically, he proved equivariant analogs of fundamental theorems such as the localization theorem.

Equivalently, $K_i^G(X)$ may be defined as the $K_i$ of the category of coherent sheaves on the quotient stack $[X/G]$. (Hence, the equivariant K-theory is a specific case of the K-theory of a stack.)

A version of the Lefschetz fixed-point theorem holds in the setting of equivariant (algebraic) K-theory.

== Fundamental theorems ==
Let X be an equivariant algebraic scheme.

Localization theorem—Given a closed immersion $Z \hookrightarrow X$ of equivariant algebraic schemes and an open immersion $Z - U \hookrightarrow X$, there is a long exact sequence of groups

$$\cdots \to K^G_i(Z) \to K^G_i(X) \to K^G_i(U) \to K^G_{i-1}(Z) \to \cdots$$

== Examples ==
One of the fundamental examples of equivariant K-theory groups are the equivariant K-groups of $G$-equivariant coherent sheaves on a points, so $K^G_i(*)$. Since $\text{Coh}^G(*)$ is equivalent to the category $\text{Rep}(G)$ of finite-dimensional representations of $G$. Then, the Grothendieck group of $\text{Rep}(G)$, denoted $R(G)$ is $K_0^G(*)$.

=== Torus ring ===
Given an algebraic torus $\mathbb{T}\cong \mathbb{G}_m^k$ a finite-dimensional representation $V$ is given by a direct sum of $1$-dimensional $\mathbb{T}$-modules called the weights of $V$. There is an explicit isomorphism between $K_\mathbb{T}$ and $\mathbb{Z}[t_1,\ldots, t_k]$ given by sending $[V]$ to its associated character.

== See also ==
- Topological K-theory, the topological equivariant K-theory
