= Quillen's theorems A and B =

Two theorems needed for Quillen's Q-construction in algebraic K-theory

In topology, a branch of mathematics, Quillen's Theorem A gives a sufficient condition for the classifying spaces of two categories to be homotopy equivalent. Quillen's Theorem B gives a sufficient condition for a square consisting of classifying spaces of categories to be homotopy Cartesian. The two theorems play central roles in Quillen's Q-construction in algebraic K-theory and are named after Daniel Quillen.

The precise statements of the theorems are as follows.

Quillen's Theorem A—If $f: C \to D$ is a functor such that the classifying space $B(d \downarrow f)$ of the comma category $d \downarrow f$ is contractible for any object d in D, then f induces a homotopy equivalence $BC \to BD$.

Quillen's Theorem B—If $f: C \to D$ is a functor that induces a homotopy equivalence $B (d' \downarrow f) \to B(d \downarrow f)$ for any morphism $d \to d'$ in D, then there is an induced long exact sequence:

$$\cdots \to \pi_{i+1} BD \to \pi_i B(d \downarrow f) \to \pi_i BC \to \pi_i BD \to \cdots.$$

In general, the homotopy fiber of $Bf: BC \to BD$ is not naturally the classifying space of a category: there is no natural category $Ff$ such that $FBf = BFf$. Theorem B constructs $Ff$ in a case when $f$ is especially nice.
