= Basic theorems in algebraic K-theory =

Four mathematical theorems

In mathematics, there are several theorems basic to algebraic K-theory.

Throughout, for simplicity, we assume when an exact category is a subcategory of another exact category, we mean it is strictly full subcategory (i.e., isomorphism-closed).

== Theorems ==
Additivity theorem—Let $B, C$ be exact categories (or other variants). Given a short exact sequence of functors $F' \rightarrowtail F \twoheadrightarrow F''$ from $B$ to $C$, $F_* \simeq F'_* + F''_*$ as $H$-space maps; consequently, $F_* = F'_* + F''_*: K_i(B) \to K_i(C)$.

The localization theorem generalizes the localization theorem for abelian categories.

Waldhausen Localization Theorem—Let $A$ be the category with cofibrations, equipped with two categories of weak equivalences, $v(A) \subset w(A)$, such that $(A, v)$ and $(A, w)$ are both Waldhausen categories. Assume $(A, w)$ has a cylinder functor satisfying the Cylinder Axiom, and that $w(A)$ satisfies the Saturation and Extension Axioms. Then

$$K(A^w) \to K(A, v) \to K(A, w)$$

is a homotopy fibration.

Resolution theorem—Let $C \subset D$ be exact categories. Assume

- (i) C is closed under extensions in D and under the kernels of admissible surjections in D.
- (ii) Every object in D admits a resolution of finite length by objects in C.

Then $K_i(C) = K_i(D)$ for all $i \ge 0$.

Let $C \subset D$ be exact categories. Then C is said to be cofinal in D if (i) it is closed under extension in D and if (ii) for each object M in D there is an N in D such that $M \oplus N$ is in C. The prototypical example is when C is the category of free modules and D is the category of projective modules.

Cofinality theorem—Let $(A, v)$ be a Waldhausen category that has a cylinder functor satisfying the Cylinder Axiom. Suppose there is a surjective homomorphism $\pi: K_0(A) \to G$ and let $B$ denote the full Waldhausen subcategory of all $X$ in $A$ with $\pi[X] = 0$ in $G$. Then $v.s. B \to v.s. A \to BG$ and its delooping $K(B) \to K(A) \to G$ are homotopy fibrations.

== See also ==
- Fundamental theorem of algebraic K-theory

== Bibliography ==
- Weibel, Charles (2013). "The K-book: An introduction to algebraic K-theory". Graduate Studies in Math. Graduate Studies in Mathematics. 145. doi:10.1090/gsm/145. ISBN 978-0-8218-9132-2.
- Ross E. Staffeldt, On Fundamental Theorems of Algebraic K-Theory
- GABE ANGELINI-KNOLL, FUNDAMENTAL THEOREMS OF ALGEBRAIC K-THEORY
- Harris, Tom (2013). "Algebraic proofs of some fundamental theorems in algebraic K-theory". arXiv:1311.5162 [math.KT].
