= Matsumoto's theorem (group theory) =

In group theory, Matsumoto's theorem, proved by Hideya Matsumoto (1964), gives conditions for two reduced words of a Coxeter group to represent the same element. Sometimes, this is also called Matsumoto's lemma.

== Statement ==
A Coxeter group is a group that admits a presentation $G= \langle X \mid R\sqcup S\rangle$, where $X$ is a set of generators, $R$ is a set of relations of the form $xyxy\ldots = yxyx\ldots$ for $x,y\in X$, where the two sides of the relation are words of same length; and $S$ is the set of relations $x^2= 1$ for all $x\in X$. The relations in $R$ are sometimes called Artin relations, because the defining relations of an Artin group have this form.

If two reduced words represent the same element of a Coxeter group, then Matsumoto's theorem states that the first word can be transformed into the second by repeatedly transforming

xyxy... to yxyx... (or vice versa).

In other words: if two reduced words are equivalent in the group, then they are equivalent under the sole Artin relations.

== Applications ==
Matsumoto's theorem implies that there is a natural map (not a group homomorphism) from a Coxeter group to the corresponding braid group, taking any element of the Coxeter group represented by some reduced word in the generators to the same word in the generators of the braid group.
