= Hideya Matsumoto =

Japanese mathematician

Hideya Matsumoto (英也, 松本) is a Japanese mathematician who works on algebraic groups, who proved Matsumoto's theorem about Coxeter groups and Matsumoto's theorem calculating the second K-group of a field.

== Publications ==
- Matsumoto, Hideya (1977), Analyse harmonique dans les systèmes de Tits bornologiques de type affine, Lecture Notes in Mathematics, vol. 590, Berlin-New York: Springer-Verlag, doi:10.1007/BFb0078020, ISBN 3-540-08249-2, MR 0579177
