= Karoubi conjecture =

Theorem connecting algebraic and topological K-theories on C* algebras

In mathematics, the Karoubi conjecture was a conjecture by Max Karoubi that the algebraic and topological K-theories coincide on C* algebras spatially tensored with the algebra of compact operators. It was proved by Andrei Suslin and Mariusz Wodzicki.
