= Parshin chain =

In number theory, a Parshin chain is a higher-dimensional analogue of a place of an algebraic number field. They were introduced by Parshin (1978) in order to define an analogue of the idele class group for 2-dimensional schemes.

A Parshin chain of dimension s on a scheme is a finite sequence of points p_{0}, p_{1}, ..., p_{s} such that p_{i} has dimension i and each point is contained in the closure of the next one.
