= Q-construction =

In algebra, Quillen's Q-construction associates to an exact category (e.g., an abelian category) an algebraic K-theory. More precisely, given an exact category C, the construction creates a topological space $B^+C$ so that $\pi_0 (B^+C)$ is the Grothendieck group of C and, when C is the category of finitely generated projective modules over a ring R, for $i = 0, 1, 2$, $\pi_i (B^+C)$ is the i-th K-group of R in the classical sense. (The notation "+" is meant to suggest the construction adds more to the classifying space BC.) One puts

$$K_i(C) = \pi_i(B^+C)$$

and call it the i-th K-group of C. Similarly, the i-th K-group of C with coefficients in a group G is defined as the homotopy group with coefficients:

$$K_i(C; G) = \pi_i(B^+ C; G)$$.

The construction is widely applicable and is used to define an algebraic K-theory in a non-classical context. For example, one can define equivariant algebraic K-theory as $\pi_*$ of $B^+$ of the category of equivariant sheaves on a scheme.

Waldhausen's S-construction generalizes the Q-construction in a stable sense; in fact, the former, which uses a more general Waldhausen category, produces a spectrum instead of a space. Grayson's binary complex also gives a construction of algebraic K-theory for exact categories. See also module spectrum#K-theory for a K-theory of a ring spectrum.

== The construction ==
Let C be an exact category; i.e., an additive full subcategory of an abelian category that is closed under extension. If there is an exact sequence $0 \to M' \to M \to M'' \to 0$ in C, then the arrow from M′ is called an admissible mono and the arrow from M is called an admissible epi.

Let QC be the category whose objects are the same as those of C and morphisms from X to Y are isomorphism classes of diagrams $X \leftarrow Z \to Y$ such that the first arrow is an admissible epi and the second admissible mono and two diagrams are isomorphic if they differ only at the middle and there is an isomorphism between them. The composition of morphisms is given by pullback.

Define a topological space $B^+ C$ by $B^+C = \Omega B QC$ where $\Omega$ is a loop space functor and $B QC$ is the classifying space of the category QC (geometric realization of the nerve). As it turns out, it is uniquely defined up to homotopy equivalence (so the notation is justified.)

== Operations ==
Every ring homomorphism $R \to S$ induces $B^+P(R) \to B^+P(S)$ and thus $K_i(P(R)) = K_i(R) \to K_i(S)$ where $P(R)$ is the category of finitely generated projective modules over R. One can easily show this map (called transfer) agrees with one defined in Milnor's Introduction to algebraic K-theory. The construction is also compatible with the suspension of a ring (cf. Grayson).

== Comparison with the classical K-theory of a ring ==
A theorem of Daniel Quillen states that, when C is the category of finitely generated projective modules over a ring R, $\pi_i(B^+C)$ is the i-th K-group of R in the classical sense for $i = 0, 1, 2$. The usual proof of the theorem (cf. Weibel 2013) relies on an intermediate homotopy equivalence. If S is a symmetric monoidal category in which every morphism is an isomorphism, one constructs (cf. Grayson) the category $S^{-1} S$ that generalizes the Grothendieck group construction of a monoid. Let C be an exact category in which every exact sequence splits, e.g., the category of finitely generated projective modules, and put $S = \operatorname{iso} C$, the subcategory of C with the same class of objects but with morphisms that are isomorphisms in C. Then there is a "natural" homotopy equivalence:

$$\Omega BQC \simeq B(S^{-1} S)$$.

The equivalence is constructed as follows. Let E be the category whose objects are short exact sequences in C and whose morphisms are isomorphism classes of diagrams between them. Let $f: E \to QC$ be the functor that sends a short exact sequence to the third term in the sequence. Note the fiber $f^{-1}(X)$, which is a subcategory, consists of exact sequences whose third term is X. This makes E a category fibered over $QC$. Writing $S^{-1} f$ for $S^{-1} E \to QC$, there is an obvious (hence natural) inclusion $\Omega BQC$ into the homotopy fiber $F (BS^{-1} f)$, which can be shown to be a homotopy equivalence. On the other hand, by Quillen's Theorem B, one can show that $B(S^{-1}S)$ is the homotopy pullback of $BS^{-1} f$ along $* \to BQC$ and thus is homotopy equivalent to the $F (BS^{-1} f)$.

We now take C to be the category of finitely generated projective modules over a ring R and shows that $\pi_i B(S^{-1} S)$ are the $K_i$ of R in the classical sense for $i = 0, 1, 2$. First of all, by definition, $\pi_0 B(S^{-1} S) = K_0(R)$. Next, $GL_n(R) = \operatorname{Aut}(R^n) \to S^{-1}S$ gives us:

$$BGL(R) = \varinjlim BGL_n(R) \to B(S^{-1}S)$$.

(Here, $BGL(R)$ is either the classifying space of the category $GL(R)$ or the Eilenberg–MacLane space of the type $K(GL(R), 1)$, amounting to the same thing.) The image actually lies in the identity component of $B(S^{-1}S)$ and so we get:

$$f: BGL(R) \to B(S^{-1}S)^0.$$

Let $S_n$ be the full subcategory of S consisting of modules isomorphic to $R^n$ (thus, $BS_n$ is the connected component containing $R^n$). Let $e \in \pi_0(BS)$ be the component containing R. Then, by a theorem of Quillen,

$$H_p(B(S^{-1}S)^0) \subset H_p(B(S^{-1}S)) = H_p(BS)[\pi_0(BS)^{-1}] = H_p(BS)[e^{-1}].$$

Thus, a class on the left is of the form $x e^{-n}$. But $x \mapsto x e^m$ is induced by the action of $R^m \in S$. Hence,

$$H_p(B(S^{-1}S)^0) = \varinjlim H_p(BS_n) = \varinjlim H_p(BGL_n(R)) = H_p(BGL(R)), \quad p \ge 0.$$

Since $B(S^{-1}S)^0$ is an H-group,

$$\pi_1(B(S^{-1}S)^0) = \pi_1(B(S^{-1}S)^0)^\text{ab} = H_1(B(S^{-1}S)^0) = H_1(BGL(R)) = H_1(GL(R)) = GL(R)^{\text{ab}} = K_1(R).$$

It remains to see $\pi_2$ is $K_2$. Writing $Ff$ for the homotopy fiber, we have the long exact sequence:

$$\pi_2(BGL(R)) = 0 \to \pi_2(B(S^{-1}S)^0) \to \pi_1 (Ff) \to \pi_1(BGL(R)) = GL(R) \to K_1(R).$$

From homotopy theory, we know the second term is central; i.e., $\pi_1(Ff) \to E(R)$ is a central extension. It then follows from the next lemma that $\pi_1(Ff)$ is the universal central extension (i.e., $\pi_1(Ff)$ is the Steinberg group of R and the kernel is $K_2(R)$.)

Lemma—Let $f: X \to Y$ be a continuous map between connected CW-complexes. If $f_*: H_*(X, L) \to H_*(Y, f^*L)$ is an isomorphism for any local coefficient system L on X, then

$$H_1(\pi_1(Ff), \Z) = H_2(\pi_1(Ff), \Z ) = 0.$$

Proof: The homotopy type of $Ff$ does not change if we replace f by the pullback $\widetilde{f}$ along the universal covering of Y $\to Y$. Thus, we can replace the hypothesis by one that Y is simply connected and $H_p(X, \Z ) \simeq H_p(Y, \Z ), p \ge 0$. Now, the Serre spectral sequences for $Ff \to X \to Y$ and $* \to Y \to Y$ say:

$${}^2 E_{pq} = H_p(Y, H_q(Ff, \Z )) \Rightarrow H_{p+q}(X, \Z ),$$
$${}^2 E'_{pq} = H_p(Y, H_q(*, \Z )) \Rightarrow H_{p+q}(Y, \Z ).$$

By the comparison theorem for spectral sequences, it follows that ${}^2 E_{0q} = {}^2 E'_{0q}$; i.e., $Ff$ is acyclic. (Coincidentally, by reversing argument, one can say this implies $H_p(X,\Z) \simeq H_p(Y,\Z);$ thus, the hypothesis of the lemma.) Next, the spectral sequence for the covering $\widetilde{Ff} \to Ff$ with group $G = \pi_1(Ff)$ says:

$${}^2 E_{pq} = H_p(G, H_q(\widetilde{Ff}, \Z )) \Rightarrow H_{p+q}(Ff, \Z ) = H_{p+q}(*, \Z ).$$

An inspection of this spectral sequence gives the desired result.
