= Boris Tsygan =

Professor of mathematics

- Occupation: Professor
- Known for: Cyclic homology

Academic background
- Education: Kiev State University Moscow State University (PhD)
- Doctoral advisor: Yuri Manin

Academic work
- Discipline: Mathematician
- Sub-discipline: Noncommutative geometry
- Institutions: Northwestern University

Boris Tsygan is a mathematician prominent in noncommutative geometry who is currently a professor of mathematics at Northwestern University. He performed his undergraduate studies at Kiev State University concluding in 1980 and earned his PhD in pure mathematics at Moscow State University in 1987. He is credited with independently discovering cyclic homology along with Alain Connes. He was advised by prominent mathematician Yuri Manin when earning his PhD.

== Research ==
Much of Tsygan's research has been centered around cyclic homology, but he has also contributed to several other branches of mathematics. Notably, he is namesake of the Tsygan Formality Conjecture and has studied K-theory with Boris Feigin.
