= Christophe Soulé =

French mathematician

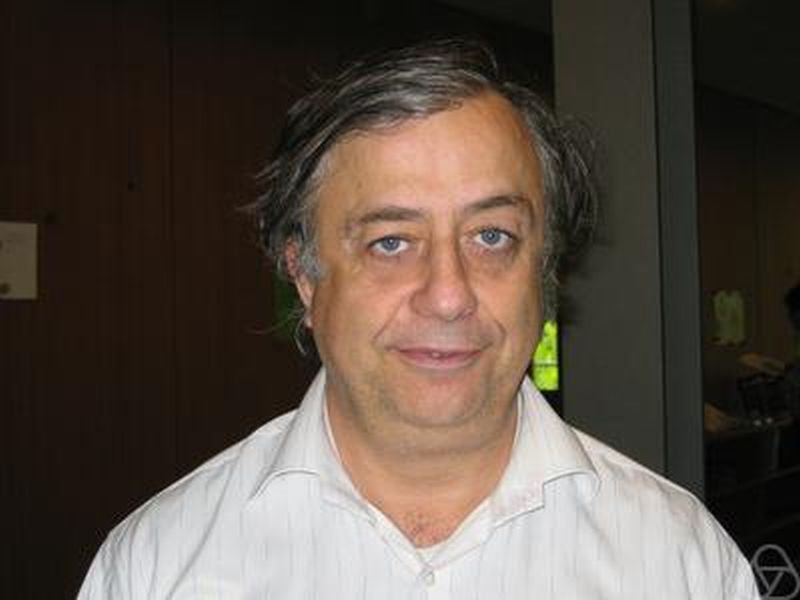
- Christophe Soulé at Oberwolfach in 2005
- Born: 1951 (age 74–75)
- Education: École Normale Supérieure; University of Paris
- Known for: Algebraic geometry, number theory
- Awards: Prize Ampère
- Scientific career
- Fields: Mathematics
- Doctoral advisors: Roger Godement; Max Karoubi
- Doctoral students: Nicușor Dan

Christophe Soulé (born 1951) is a French mathematician working in arithmetic geometry.

== Education ==
Soulé started his studies in 1970 at École Normale Supérieure in Paris. He completed his Ph.D. at the University of Paris in 1979 under the supervision of Max Karoubi and Roger Godement, with a dissertation titled K-Théorie des anneaux d'entiers de corps de nombres et cohomologie étale.

== Awards and recognition ==
In 1979, he was awarded a CNRS Bronze Medal. He received the Prix J. Ponti in 1985 and the Prize Ampère in 1993.

Since 2001, he is member of the French Academy of Sciences. In 1983, he was invited speaker at the International Congress of Mathematicians (ICM) in Warsaw.

== Publications ==
- Christophe Soulé, with the collaboration of Dan Abramovich, Jean-François Burnol, and Jürg Kramer: Lectures on Arakelov Geometry. Cambridge Studies in Advanced Mathematics 33. Cambridge University Press, 1992. doi:10.1017/CBO9780511623950, ISBN 0-521-41669-8
- Henri Gillet, Christophe Soulé: An arithmetic Riemann–Roch Theorem, Inventiones Mathematicae 110 (1992), no. 3, 473–543. doi:10.1007/BF01231343, MR 1189489
