= Bass conjecture =

In mathematics, especially algebraic geometry, the Bass conjecture says that certain algebraic K-groups are supposed to be finitely generated. The conjecture was proposed by Hyman Bass.

== Statement of the conjecture ==
Any of the following equivalent statements is referred to as the Bass conjecture.

- For any finitely generated Z-algebra A, the groups K'_{n}(A) are finitely generated (K-theory of finitely generated A-modules, also known as G-theory of A) for all n ≥ 0.
- For any finitely generated Z-algebra A, that is a regular ring, the groups K_{n}(A) are finitely generated (K-theory of finitely generated locally free A-modules).
- For any scheme X of finite type over Spec(Z), K'_{n}(X) is finitely generated.
- For any regular scheme X of finite type over Z, K_{n}(X) is finitely generated.

The equivalence of these statements follows from the agreement of K- and K'-theory for regular rings and the localization sequence for K'-theory.

== Known cases ==
Daniel Quillen showed that the Bass conjecture holds for all (regular, depending on the version of the conjecture) rings or schemes of dimension ≤ 1, i.e., algebraic curves over finite fields and the spectrum of the ring of integers in a number field.

The (non-regular) ring A = Z[x, y]/x^{2} has an infinitely generated K_{1}(A).

== Implications ==
The Bass conjecture is known to imply the Beilinson–Soulé vanishing conjecture.
