= Waldhausen category =

Category theory

In mathematics, a Waldhausen category is a category C equipped with some additional data, which makes it possible to construct the K-theory spectrum of C using a so-called S-construction. It's named after Friedhelm Waldhausen, who introduced this notion (under the term category with cofibrations and weak equivalences) to extend the methods of algebraic K-theory to categories not necessarily of algebraic origin, for example the category of topological spaces.

== Definition ==
Let C be a category, co(C) and we(C) two classes of morphisms in C, called cofibrations and weak equivalences respectively. The triple (C, co(C), we(C)) is called a Waldhausen category if it satisfies the following axioms, motivated by the similar properties for the notions of cofibrations and weak homotopy equivalences of topological spaces:

- C has a zero object, denoted by 0;
- isomorphisms are included in both co(C) and we(C);
- co(C) and we(C) are closed under composition;
- for each object A ∈ C the unique map 0 → A is a cofibration, i.e. is an element of co(C);
- co(C) and we(C) are compatible with pushouts in a certain sense.

For example, if $\scriptstyle A\, \rightarrowtail\, B$ is a cofibration and $\scriptstyle A\,\to\, C$ is any map, then there must exist a pushout $\scriptstyle B\, \cup_A\, C$, and the natural map $\scriptstyle C\, \rightarrowtail\, B\,\cup_A\, C$ should be cofibration:

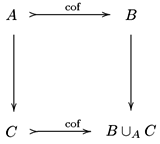

== Relations with other notions ==
In algebraic K-theory and homotopy theory there are several notions of categories equipped with some specified classes of morphisms. If C has a structure of an exact category, then by defining we(C) to be isomorphisms, co(C) to be admissible monomorphisms, one obtains a structure of a Waldhausen category on C. Both kinds of structure may be used to define K-theory of C, using the Q-construction for an exact structure and S-construction for a Waldhausen structure. An important fact is that the resulting K-theory spaces are homotopy equivalent.

If C is a model category with a zero object, then the full subcategory of cofibrant objects in C may be given a Waldhausen structure.

== S-construction ==
The Waldhausen S-construction produces from a Waldhausen category C a sequence of Kan complexes $S_n(C)$, which forms a spectrum. Let $K(C)$ denote the loop space of the geometric realization $|S_*(C)|$ of $S_*(C)$. Then the group

$$\pi_n K(C) = \pi_{n+1} |S_*(C)|$$

is the n-th K-group of C. Thus, it gives a way to define higher K-groups. Another approach for higher K-theory is Quillen's Q-construction.

The construction is due to Friedhelm Waldhausen.

== biWaldhausen categories ==
A category C is equipped with bifibrations if it has cofibrations and its opposite category C^{OP} has so also. In that case, we denote the fibrations of C^{OP} by quot(C). In that case, C is a biWaldhausen category if C has bifibrations and weak equivalences such that both (C, co(C), we) and (C^{OP}, quot(C), we^{OP}) are Waldhausen categories.

Waldhausen and biWaldhausen categories are linked with algebraic K-theory. There, many interesting categories are complicial biWaldhausen categories. For example: The category $\scriptstyle C^b(\mathcal{A})$ of bounded chain complexes on an exact category $\scriptstyle \mathcal{A}$. The category $\scriptstyle S_n \mathcal{C}$ of functors $\scriptstyle \operatorname{Ar}(\Delta ^n)\, \to\, \mathcal{C}$ when $\scriptstyle\mathcal{C}$ is so. And given a diagram $\scriptstyle I$, then $\scriptstyle \mathcal{C}^I$ is a nice complicial biWaldhausen category when $\scriptstyle \mathcal{C}$ is.

== See also ==
- Complete Segal space
