= Rigidity (K-theory) =

In mathematics, rigidity of K-theory encompasses results relating algebraic K-theory of different rings.

== Suslin rigidity ==
Suslin rigidity, named after Andrei Suslin, refers to the invariance of mod-n algebraic K-theory under the base change between two algebraically closed fields: Suslin (1983) showed that for an extension

$$E / F$$

of algebraically closed fields, and an algebraic variety X / F, there is an isomorphism

$$K_*(X, \mathbf Z/n) \cong K_*(X \times_F E, \mathbf Z/n),$$

between the mod-n K-theory of coherent sheaves on X, respectively its base change to E. A textbook account of this fact in the case X = F, including the resulting computation of K-theory of algebraically closed fields in characteristic p, is in Weibel (2013).

This result has stimulated various other papers. For example Röndigs & Østvær (2008) show that the base change functor for the mod-n stable A^{1}-homotopy category

$$\mathrm{SH}(F, \mathbf Z/n) \to \mathrm{SH}(E, \mathbf Z/n)$$

is fully faithful. A similar statement for non-commutative motives has been established by Tabuada (2018).

== Gabber rigidity ==
Another type of rigidity relates the mod-n K-theory of an henselian ring A to the one of its residue field A/m. This rigidity result is referred to as Gabber rigidity, in view of the work of Gabber (1992) who showed that there is an isomorphism

$$K_*(A, \mathbf Z/n) = K_*(A / m, \mathbf Z/n)$$

provided that n≥1 is an integer which is invertible in A.

If n is not invertible in A, the result as above still holds, provided that K-theory is replaced by the fiber of the cyclotomic trace map between K-theory and topological cyclic homology. This was shown by Clausen, Mathew & Morrow (2021).

== Applications ==
Jardine (1993) used Gabber's and Suslin's rigidity result to reprove Quillen's computation of K-theory of finite fields.
