= Mennicke symbol =

In mathematics, a Mennicke symbol is a map from pairs of elements of a number field to an abelian group satisfying some identities found by Mennicke (1965). They were named by Bass, Milnor & Serre (1967), who used them in their solution of the congruence subgroup problem.

== Definition ==
Suppose that A is a Dedekind domain and q is a non-zero ideal of A. The set W_{q} is defined to be the set of pairs (a, b) with a = 1 mod q, b = 0 mod q, such that a and b generate the unit ideal.

A Mennicke symbol on W_{q} with values in a group C is a function (a, b) → [^{b}_{a}] from W_{q} to C such that

- [^{0}_{1}] = 1, [^{bc}_{a}] = [^{b}_{a}][^{c}_{a}]
- [^{b}_{a}] = [^{b + ta}_{a}] if t is in q, [^{b}_{a}] = [^{b}_{a + tb}] if t is in A.

There is a universal Mennicke symbol with values in a group C_{q} such that any Mennicke symbol with values in C can be obtained by composing the universal Mennicke symbol with a unique homomorphism from C_{q} to C.
