= Steinberg group (K-theory) =

In algebraic K-theory, a field of mathematics, the Steinberg group $\operatorname{St}(A)$ of a ring $A$ is the universal central extension of the commutator subgroup of the stable general linear group of $A$.

It is named after Robert Steinberg, and it is connected with lower $K$-groups, notably $K_{2}$ and $K_{3}$.

== Definition ==
Abstractly, given a ring $A$, the Steinberg group $\operatorname{St}(A)$ is the universal central extension of the commutator subgroup of the stable general linear group (the commutator subgroup is perfect and so has a universal central extension).

=== Presentation using generators and relations ===
A concrete presentation using generators and relations is as follows. Elementary matrices — i.e. matrices of the form ${e_{pq}}(\lambda) := \mathbf{1} + {a_{pq}}(\lambda)$, where $\mathbf{1}$ is the identity matrix, ${a_{pq}}(\lambda)$ is the matrix with $\lambda$ in the $(p,q)$-entry and zeros elsewhere, and $p \neq q$ — satisfy the following relations, called the Steinberg relations:

$$\begin{align}
e_{ij}(\lambda) e_{ij}(\mu)                & = e_{ij}(\lambda+\mu);  && \\
\left[ e_{ij}(\lambda),e_{jk}(\mu) \right] & = e_{ik}(\lambda \mu),  && \text{for } i \neq k; \\
\left[ e_{ij}(\lambda),e_{kl}(\mu) \right] & = \mathbf{1},           && \text{for } i \neq l \text{ and } j \neq k.
\end{align}$$

The unstable Steinberg group of order $r$ over $A$, denoted by ${\operatorname{St}_{r}}(A)$, is defined by the generators ${x_{ij}}(\lambda)$, where $1 \leq i \neq j \leq r$ and $\lambda \in A$, these generators being subject to the Steinberg relations. The stable Steinberg group, denoted by $\operatorname{St}(A)$, is the direct limit of the system ${\operatorname{St}_{r}}(A) \to {\operatorname{St}_{r + 1}}(A)$. It can also be thought of as the Steinberg group of infinite order.

Mapping ${x_{ij}}(\lambda) \mapsto {e_{ij}}(\lambda)$ yields a group homomorphism $\varphi: \operatorname{St}(A) \to {\operatorname{GL}_{\infty}}(A)$. As the elementary matrices generate the commutator subgroup, this mapping is surjective onto the commutator subgroup.

=== Interpretation as a fundamental group ===
The Steinberg group is the fundamental group of the Volodin space, which is the union of classifying spaces of the unipotent subgroups of $\operatorname{GL}(A)$.

== Relation to K-theory ==
=== K_{1} ===
${K_{1}}(A)$ is the cokernel of the map $\varphi: \operatorname{St}(A) \to {\operatorname{GL}_{\infty}}(A)$, as $K_{1}$ is the abelianization of ${\operatorname{GL}_{\infty}}(A)$ and the mapping $\varphi$ is surjective onto the commutator subgroup.

=== K_{2} ===
${K_{2}}(A)$ is the center of the Steinberg group. This was Milnor's definition, and it also follows from more general definitions of higher $K$-groups.

It is also the kernel of the mapping $\varphi: \operatorname{St}(A) \to {\operatorname{GL}_{\infty}}(A)$. Indeed, there is an exact sequence

$$1 \to {K_{2}}(A) \to \operatorname{St}(A) \to {\operatorname{GL}_{\infty}}(A) \to {K_{1}}(A) \to 1.$$

Equivalently, it is the Schur multiplier of the group of elementary matrices, so it is also a homology group: ${K_{2}}(A) = {H_{2}}(E(A);\mathbb{Z})$.

=== K_{3} ===
Gersten (1973) showed that ${K_{3}}(A) = {H_{3}}(\operatorname{St}(A);\mathbb{Z})$.
