= Spencer Bloch =

American mathematician

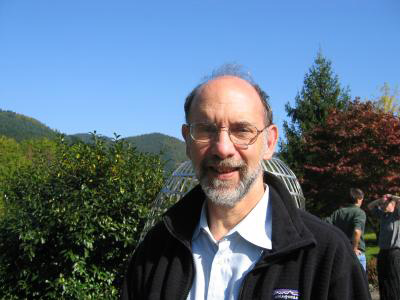
- Bloch at Oberwolfach in 2004
- Born: May 22, 1944 (age 82); New York City
- Education: Harvard College; Columbia University
- Known for: Bloch–Kato conjectures
- Scientific career
- Fields: Mathematics
- Workplaces: University of Chicago
- Doctoral advisor: Steven Kleiman
- Doctoral students: Patrick Brosnan; Caterina Consani; Steven Zucker

Spencer Janney Bloch (born May 22, 1944) is an American mathematician known for his contributions to algebraic geometry and algebraic K-theory. Bloch is the R. M. Hutchins Distinguished Service Professor Emeritus in the Department of Mathematics of the University of Chicago.

== Research ==
Bloch introduced the Bloch group in 1978. He introduced Bloch's higher Chow group, a generalization of Chow groups, in 1986. He also introduced Bloch's formula in Algebraic K-theory.

Bloch and Kazuya Kato formulated the motivic Bloch–Kato conjecture relating Milnor K-theory and Galois cohomology in 1986 and the Bloch–Kato conjectures for special values of L-functions in 1990.

== Awards and honors ==
Bloch is a member of the U.S. National Academy of Sciences and a Fellow of the American Academy of Arts and Sciences and of the American Mathematical Society.

He received a Humboldt Prize in 1996. He also received a 2021 Leroy P. Steele Prize for Lifetime Achievement.

At the International Congress of Mathematicians, he gave an invited lecture in 1978 and a plenary lecture in 1990. He was a visiting scholar at the Institute for Advanced Study in 1981–82.
