= Ring of mixed characteristic =

In commutative algebra, a ring of mixed characteristic is a commutative ring $R$ having characteristic zero and having an ideal $I$ such that $R/I$ has positive characteristic.

== Examples ==
- The integers $\Z$ have characteristic zero, but for any prime number $p$, $\mathbb{F}_p=\Z/p\Z$ is a finite field with $p$ elements and hence has characteristic $p$.
- The ring of integers of any number field is of mixed characteristic
- Fix a prime $p$ and localize the integers at the prime ideal $(p)$. The resulting ring $\Z_p$ has characteristic zero. It has a unique maximal ideal $p\Z_{(p)}$, and the quotient $\Z_{(p)}/p\Z_{(p)}$ is a finite field with $p$ elements. In contrast to the previous example, the only possible characteristics for rings of the form $\Z_{(p)}/I$ are zero (when $I$ is the zero ideal) and powers of $p$ (when $I$ is any other non-unit ideal); it is not possible to have a quotient of any other characteristic.
- If $P$ is a non-zero prime ideal of the ring $\mathcal{O}_K$ of integers of a number field $K$, then the localization of $\mathcal{O}_K$ at $P$ is likewise of mixed characteristic.
- The $p$-adic integers $\Z_p$ for any prime $p$ are a ring of characteristic zero. However, they have an ideal generated by the image of the prime number $p$ under the canonical map $\Z\rightarrow\Z_p$. The quotient $\Z_{p}/p\Z_p$ is again the finite field of $p$ elements. $\Z_p$ is an example of a complete discrete valuation ring of mixed characteristic.
