= Boris Feigin =

Russian mathematician (born 1953)

- Born: Boris Lvovich Feigin; 20 November 1953 (age 72); Moscow, Soviet Union
- Education: Moscow State University
- Scientific career
- Fields: Mathematics
- Workplaces: Independent University of Moscow; Landau Institute for Theoretical Physics; National Research University – Higher School of Economics; The Hebrew University of Jerusalem
- Doctoral advisor: Israel Gelfand, Dmitry Fuchs
- Doctoral students: Edward Frenkel, Alexander Odesski, Boris Tsygan, Boris Shoikhet, Sergey Loktev, Sergey Arkhipov, Leonid Rybnikov, Vladimir Dotsenko, Anton Khoroshkin

Boris Lvovich Feigin (Hebrew: בוריס פייגין; Russian: Бори́с Льво́вич Фе́йгин; born 20 November 1953) is a Russian and Israeli mathematician. His research has spanned representation theory, mathematical physics, algebraic geometry, Lie groups and Lie algebras, conformal field theory, homological and homotopical algebra.

In 1969, Feigin graduated from the Moscow Mathematical School No. 2 (Andrei Zelevinsky was among his classmates). From 1969 until 1974, he was a student in the Faculty of Mechanics and Mathematics at Moscow State University (MSU) under joint supervision of Dmitry Fuchs and Israel Gelfand. His diploma thesis was dedicated to characteristic classes of flags of foliations. Feigin was not accepted to the graduate school of MSU due to increasingly antisemitic policies at that institution at that time. After working as a computer programmer in industry for some time, he was accepted in 1976 to the graduate school of Yaroslavl State University and defended his thesis "Cohomology of current Lie algebras on smooth manifolds" in 1981 at Steklov Institute in Leningrad. He was an invited speaker at the International Congress of Mathematicians in Kyoto in 1990.

Boris Feigin is a professor at the Independent University of Moscow and a senior research fellow at Landau Institute for Theoretical Physics since 1992. Since 2009, he is a professor of the Faculty of Mathematics at the Higher School of Economics (HSE). In 2013 he was promoted to Distinguished professor at HSE. Since 2014, he is the head of the Laboratory of Representation Theory and Mathematical Physics at HSE.

In 2023, Feigin immigrated to Israel and joined the faculty of the Hebrew University of Jerusalem.

Boris Feigin is a member of the editorial boards of mathematics journals Functional Analysis and Its Applications, Moscow Mathematical Journal, Transformation groups.
