= Max Karoubi =

French mathematician

- Born: 10 November 1938 (age 87); Tunis, Tunisia
- Education: École normale supérieure University of Paris
- Known for: K-theory
- Awards: Prix de l'Académie des Sciences Paris; Médaille d'argent du CNRS; Prix Leloir du gouvernement argentin
- Scientific career
- Fields: Mathematics
- Workplaces: Paris Diderot University
- Doctoral advisor: Henri Cartan; Alexander Grothendieck

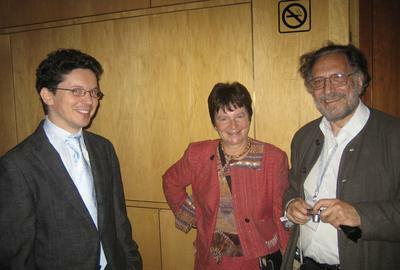
Max Karoubi (right) with Wendelin Werner (left) at ICM 2006 in Madrid

Max Karoubi (French: [kaʁubi]) is a French mathematician, topologist, who works on K-theory, cyclic homology and noncommutative geometry and who founded the first European Congress of Mathematics.

In 1967, he received his Ph.D. in mathematics (Doctorat d'État) from the University of Paris, under the supervision of Henri Cartan and Alexander Grothendieck.

In 1973, he was nominated full professor at the University of Paris 7-Denis Diderot until 2007. He is now an emeritus professor there. In 2012 he became a fellow of the American Mathematical Society.

Karoubi has supervised 12 Ph.D. students, including Jean-Louis Loday and Christophe Soulé.

== See also ==
- Karoubi conjecture
- Karoubi envelope

== Publications ==
- M. Karoubi (1968). "Algèbres de Clifford et K-théorie". Ann. Sci. Éc. Norm. Supér. 1 (2): 161–270. doi:10.24033/asens.1163.
- Karoubi, Max (1978), K-theory, Berlin, New York: Springer-Verlag, ISBN 978-3-540-08090-9, MR 0488029
- Karoubi, Max (1979), "K-théorie algébrique de certaines algèbres d'opérateurs", in Harpe, Pierre de la (ed.), Algèbres d'opérateurs (Sém., Les Plans-sur-Bex, 1978), Lecture Notes in Math., vol. 725, Berlin, New York: Springer-Verlag, pp. 254–290, doi:10.1007/BFb0062621, ISBN 978-3-540-09512-5, MR 0548119
