= Characteristic (algebra) =

Smallest integer n for which n equals 0 in a ring

In mathematics, the characteristic of a ring $R$, often denoted $\operatorname{char}(R)$, is defined to be the smallest positive number of copies of the ring's multiplicative identity (1) that will sum to the additive identity (0). If no such number exists, the ring is said to have characteristic zero.

That is, $\operatorname{char}(R)$ is the smallest positive number $n$ such that

$$\underbrace{1+\cdots+1}_{n \text{ summands}} = 0$$

if such a number $n$ exists, and $0$ otherwise.

== Motivation ==
The special definition of the characteristic zero is motivated by the equivalent definitions characterized in the next section, where the characteristic zero is not required to be considered separately.

The characteristic may also be taken to be the exponent of the ring's additive group, that is, the smallest positive integer $n$ such that:

$$\underbrace{a+\cdots+a}_{n \text{ summands}} = 0$$

for every element $a$ of the ring (again, if $n$ exists; otherwise zero). This definition is equivalent for a ring, because of distributivity. For rngs (rings without identity), the former definition is nonsensical, and the latter definition is generally used.

Integers, rational numbers and real numbers have characteristic 0.

The integers modulo n have characteristic $n$.

Every Boolean ring has characteristic 2.

The characteristic of a field is either 0 or a prime number.

== Equivalent characterizations ==
- The characteristic of a ring $R$ is the natural number $n$ such that $n\mathbb{Z}$ is the kernel of the unique ring homomorphism from $\mathbb{Z}$ to $R$. (Note: The requirements of ring homomorphisms are such that there can be only one (in fact, exactly one) homomorphism from the ring of integers to any ring; in the language of category theory, $\mathbb{Z}$ is an initial object of the category of rings. Again this applies when a ring has a multiplicative identity element (which is preserved by ring homomorphisms).)
- The characteristic is the natural number $n$ such that $R$ contains a subring isomorphic to the factor ring $\mathbb{Z}/n\mathbb{Z}$, which is the image of the above homomorphism.
- When the non-negative integers $\{0,1,2,3,\dots\}$ are partially ordered by divisibility, then $1$ is the smallest and $0$ is the largest. Then the characteristic of a ring is the smallest value of $n$ for which $n\cdot 1 = 0$. If nothing "smaller" (in this ordering) than 0 will suffice, then the characteristic is $0$. This is the appropriate partial ordering because of such facts as that $\operatorname{char}(A\times B)$ is the least common multiple of $\operatorname{char}(A)$ and $\operatorname{char}(B)$, and that no ring homomorphism $f:A\to B$ exists unless $\operatorname{char}(B)$ divides $\operatorname{char}(A)$.
- The characteristic of a ring $R$ is $n$ precisely if the statement $ka=0$ for all $a\in R$ holds if and only if $k$ is a multiple of $n$.

== Case of rings ==
If R and S are rings and there exists a ring homomorphism R → S, then the characteristic of S divides the characteristic of R. This can sometimes be used to exclude the possibility of certain ring homomorphisms. The only ring with characteristic 1 is the zero ring, which has only a single element 0. If a nontrivial ring R does not have any nontrivial zero divisors, then its characteristic is either 0 or prime. In particular, this applies to all fields, to all integral domains, and to all division rings. Any ring of characteristic zero is infinite.

The ring $\mathbb{Z}/n\mathbb{Z}$ of integers modulo n has characteristic n. If R is a subring of S, then R and S have the same characteristic. For example, if p is prime and q(X) is an irreducible polynomial with coefficients in the field $\mathbb F_p$ with p elements, then the quotient ring $\mathbb F_p[X]/(q(X))$ is a field of characteristic p. Another example: The field $\mathbb{C}$ of complex numbers contains $\mathbb{Z}$, so the characteristic of $\mathbb{C}$ is 0.

A $\mathbb{Z}/n\mathbb{Z}$-algebra is equivalently a ring whose characteristic divides n. This is because for every ring R there is a ring homomorphism $\mathbb{Z}\to R$, and this map factors through $\mathbb{Z}/n\mathbb{Z}$ if and only if the characteristic of R divides n. In this case for any r in the ring, then adding r to itself n times gives nr = 0.

If a commutative ring R has prime characteristic p, then we have (x + y)^{p} = x^{p} + y^{p} for all elements x and y in R – the normally incorrect "freshman's dream" holds for power p. The map x ↦ x^{p} then defines a ring homomorphism R → R, which is called the Frobenius homomorphism. If R is also an integral domain, the homomorphism is injective.

== Case of fields ==
As mentioned above, the characteristic of any field is either 0 or a prime number. A field of non-zero characteristic is called a field of finite characteristic or positive characteristic or prime characteristic. The characteristic exponent is defined similarly, except that it is equal to 1 when the characteristic is 0; otherwise it has the same value as the characteristic.

Any field F has a unique minimal subfield, also called its prime field. This subfield is isomorphic to either the rational number field $\mathbb{Q}$ or a finite field $\mathbb F_p$ of prime order. Two prime fields of the same characteristic are isomorphic, and this isomorphism is unique. In other words, there is essentially a unique prime field in each characteristic.

=== Fields of characteristic zero ===
The fields of characteristic zero are those that have a subfield isomorphic to the field $\Q$ of the rational numbers. The most common of such fields are the subfields of the field $\C$ of the complex numbers; this includes the real numbers $\mathbb{R}$ and all algebraic number fields.

Other fields of characteristic zero are the p-adic fields that are widely used in number theory.

Fields of rational fractions over the integers or a field of characteristic zero are other common examples.

Ordered fields always have characteristic zero; they include $\mathbb{Q}$ and $\mathbb{R}.$

=== Fields of prime characteristic ===
The finite field $\mathbb{F}_{p^n}$ has characteristic $p$.

There exist infinite fields of prime characteristic. For example, the field of all rational functions over $\mathbb{Z}/p\mathbb{Z}$, the algebraic closure of $\mathbb{Z}/p\mathbb{Z}$ or the field of formal Laurent series $\mathbb{Z}/p\mathbb{Z}((T))$.

The size of any finite ring of prime characteristic $p$ is a power of $p$. Since in that case it contains $\mathbb{Z}/p\mathbb{Z}$ it is also a vector space over that field, and from linear algebra we know that the sizes of finite vector spaces over finite fields are a power of the size of the field. This also shows that the size of any finite vector space is a prime power. (Note: It is a vector space over a finite field, which we have shown to be of size $p^n$, so its size is $(p^n)^m=p^{nm}$.)

== See also ==
- Ring of mixed characteristic

== Sources ==
- McCoy, Neal H. (1973) [1964]. The Theory of Rings. Chelsea Publishing. p. 4. ISBN 978-0-8284-0266-8.
