= Friedhelm Waldhausen =

German mathematician (born 1938)

- Born: 1938; Hückelhoven, Germany
- Died: November 21, 2024
- Education: University of Bonn
- Known for: Waldhausen S-construction Waldhausen category
- Scientific career
- Fields: Mathematics
- Workplaces: Bielefeld University

Friedhelm Waldhausen (born 1938 in Millich, Hückelhoven, Rhine Province, died November 21, 2024) was a German mathematician known for his work in algebraic topology. He made fundamental contributions in the fields of 3-manifolds and (algebraic) K-theory.

== Career ==
Waldhausen studied mathematics at the University of Göttingen, LMU Munich, and the University of Bonn. He obtained his Ph.D. in 1966 from the University of Bonn; his advisor was Friedrich Hirzebruch and his thesis was entitled "Eine Klasse von 3-dimensionalen Mannigfaltigkeiten" (A class of 3-dimensional manifolds).

After visits to Princeton University, the University of Illinois, and the University of Michigan he moved in 1968 to Kiel University, where he completed his habilitation (qualified to assume a professorship).

In 1969, he was appointed professor at the Ruhr University Bochum before in 1971 becoming a professor at Bielefeld University, an appointment he held until his retirement in 2004.

== Academic work ==
His early work was mainly on the theory of 3-manifolds. He dealt mainly with Haken manifolds and Heegaard splitting. Among other things, he proved that, roughly speaking, any homotopy equivalence of Haken manifolds is homotopic to a homeomorphism, i.e. that closed Haken manifolds are topologically rigid. He put forward the Waldhausen conjecture about Heegaard splitting.

In the mid-seventies, he extended the connection between geometric topology and algebraic K-theory by introducing A-theory, a kind of algebraic K-theory for topological spaces. This led to new foundations for algebraic K-theory (using what are now called Waldhausen categories) and also gave new impetus to the study of highly structured ring spectra.

== Recognition ==
Today, Waldhausen is seen, together with Daniel Quillen, as one of the pioneers of algebraic K-theory. Among others, he was awarded the von Staudt Prize in 2004 along with Günter Harder, and an honorary doctorate from Osnabrück University.

== Important publications ==
- Algebraic $K$-theory of spaces, Algebraic and geometric topology (New Brunswick, N.J., 1983), 318–419, Lecture Notes in Math., 1126, Springer, Berlin, 1985.
- Algebraic $K$-theory of spaces, concordance, and stable homotopy theory, Algebraic topology and algebraic $K$-theory (Princeton, N.J., 1983), 392–417, Ann. of Math. Stud., 113, Princeton Univ. Press, Princeton, NJ, 1987.
- (with Marcel Bökstedt) The map $BSG\to A(*)\to QS^0$, Algebraic topology and algebraic $K$-theory (Princeton, N.J., 1983), 418–431, Ann. of Math. Stud., 113, Princeton Univ. Press, Princeton, NJ, 1987.

== See also ==
- Graph manifold
- Loop theorem
- K-theory of a category
- Smith conjecture
- Surface subgroup conjecture
- Virtually Haken conjecture
- History of knot theory
- Waldhausen category
- Waldhausen S-construction
