= Charles Weibel =

American mathematician

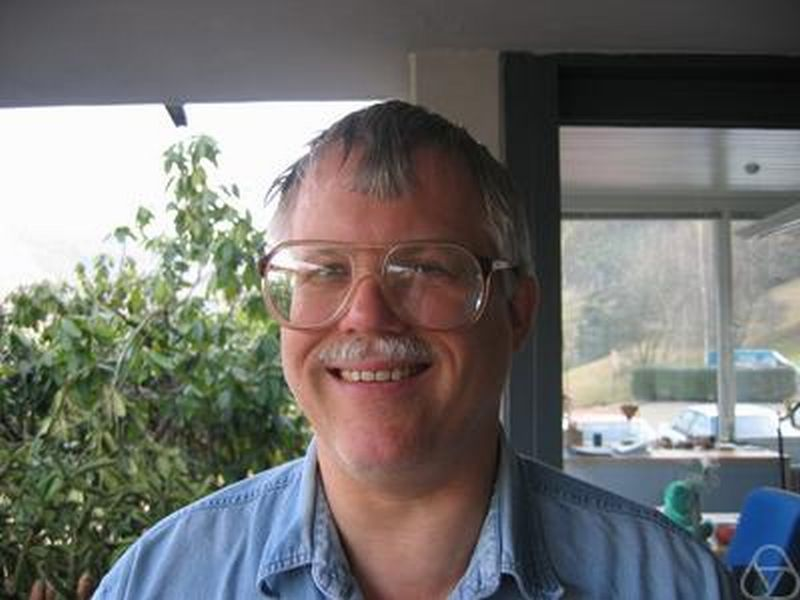
Charles A. Weibel at Oberwolfach in 2004

Charles Alexander Weibel (born October 28, 1950, in Terre Haute, Indiana) is an American mathematician working on algebraic K-theory, algebraic geometry and homological algebra.

Weibel studied physics and mathematics at the University of Michigan, earning bachelor's degrees in both subjects in 1972. He was awarded a master's degree by the University of Chicago in 1973 and achieved his doctorate in 1977 under the supervision of Richard Swan (Homotopy in Algebraic K-Theory). From 1970 to 1976 he was an "Operations Research Analyst" at Standard Oil of Indiana, and from 1977 to 1978 was at the Institute for Advanced Study. In 1978 he became an assistant professor at the University of Pennsylvania. In 1980 he became an assistant professor at Rutgers University, where he was promoted to professor in 1989.

He joined Vladimir Voevodsky and Markus Rost in proving the (motivic) Bloch–Kato conjecture (2009). It is a generalization of the Milnor conjecture of algebraic K-theory, which was proved by Voevodsky in the 1990s. He was a visiting professor in 1992 at the University of Paris and 1993 at the University of Strasbourg. Since 1983 he has been an editor of the Journal of Pure and Applied Algebra. He helped found the K-theory Foundation in 2010, and has been a managing editor of the Annals of K-theory since 2014. In 2014, he became a Fellow of the American Mathematical Society.

== Writings ==
- With Eric Friedlander, An overview over algebraic K-theory, in Algebraic K-theory and its applications, World Scientific 1999, pp. 1–119 (1997 Trieste Lecture Notes)
- Weibel, Charles A. (2013), The K-book, Graduate Studies in Mathematics, vol. 145, American Mathematical Society, Providence, RI, ISBN 978-0-8218-9132-2, MR 3076731
- With Carlo Mazza, Vladimir Voevodsky Lectures on Motivic Cohomology, Clay Monographs in Mathematics, American Mathematical Society 2006
- An introduction to homological algebra, Cambridge University Press 1994
- The proof of the Bloch-Kato conjecture, Trieste Lectures 2007, ICTP Lecture Notes Series 23 (2008), 277–305
  - "2007 Trieste Lectures on The Proof of the Block-Kato Conjecture by Charles Weibel" (PDF). ICTP SMR/1840-9.
- Weibel, Charles A. (2019), The Norm Residue Theorem in Motivic Cohomology, Annals of Mathematics Studies, vol. 200, Princeton University Press, ISBN 9780691191041
