= Marc Levine (mathematician) =

American mathematician

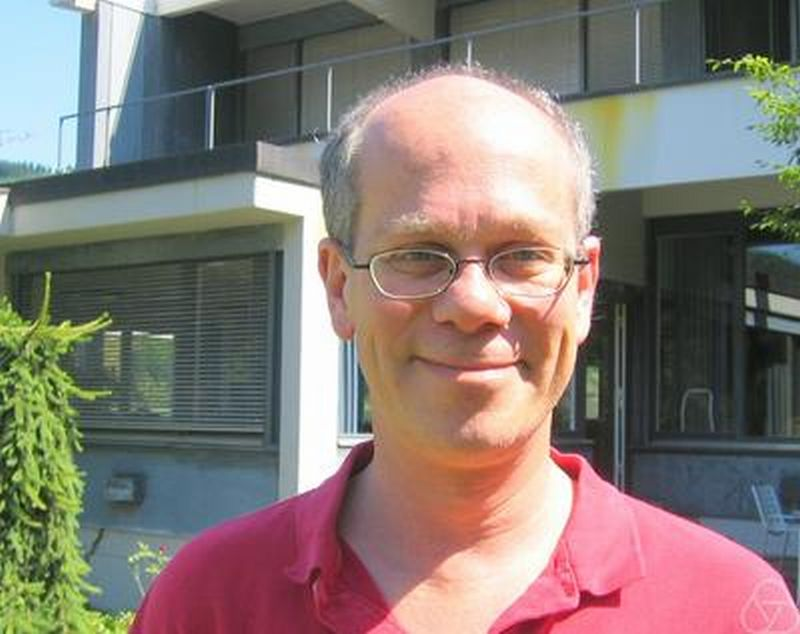
Marc Levine, Oberwolfach 2006

Marc Noel Levine (born July 29, 1952, in Detroit, Michigan) is an American mathematician.

== Life and work ==
Levine graduated from the Massachusetts Institute of Technology (bachelor's degree in 1974) and earned his doctorate in 1979 from Brandeis University under Teruhisa Matsusaka. He was assistant professor at the University of Pennsylvania in Philadelphia from 1979 and at Northeastern University from 1984 in Boston, where he has been associate professor since 1986 and since 1988 professor. He was a visiting professor at University Duisburg-Essen, where he worked with Hélène Esnault. Since 2009 he has been Alexander von Humboldt Professor there. He was also a visiting scholar at MSRI (1986, 1990), Max Planck Institute for Mathematics in Bonn (1983, 1987), Tata Institute of Fundamental Research (1988), at University of Washington, Caltech, University Paris VI and Henri Poincaré Institute.

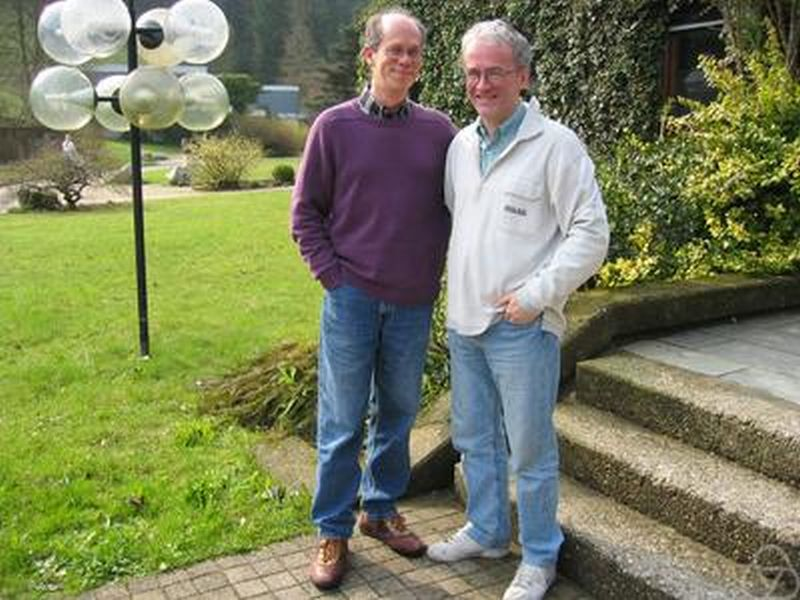
Marc Levine (left) with Fabien Morel, Oberwolfach 2005

Levine works in algebraic geometry, in particular in the development of analogues of concepts from algebraic topology in algebraic geometry and the theory of motives (motivic cohomology, motivic homotopy, algebraic K theory). He developed, together with Fabien Morel, the theory of algebraic cobordism, an algebraic-geometry analog of the theory of cobordism in algebraic topology. In 2002, he was an invited speaker at ICM in Beijing (Algebraic Cobordism).

== Honors and awards ==
In 2001 he received the Wolfgang Paul Award of the Alexander von Humboldt Foundation and in 2006 received the Humboldt Research Award. In 2013 he was elected to the Leopoldina.

In 2018 he was awarded the Senior Berwick Prize of the London Mathematical Society.

== Selected writings ==
- Mixed Motives, American Mathematical Society 1998
- Mixed Motives, in E. Friedlander, D. Grayson (Editor): Handbook of K-Theory, vol. 1, Springer, 2005, p. 429
- Algebraic Cobordism, ICM 2002, pdf file
- with Fabien Morel: Algebraic Cobordism, Springer 2007

== See also ==
- Bloch's higher Chow group
