= Alexander Merkurjev =

Russian American mathematician (born 1955)

- Aleksandr Sergeyevich Merkurjev
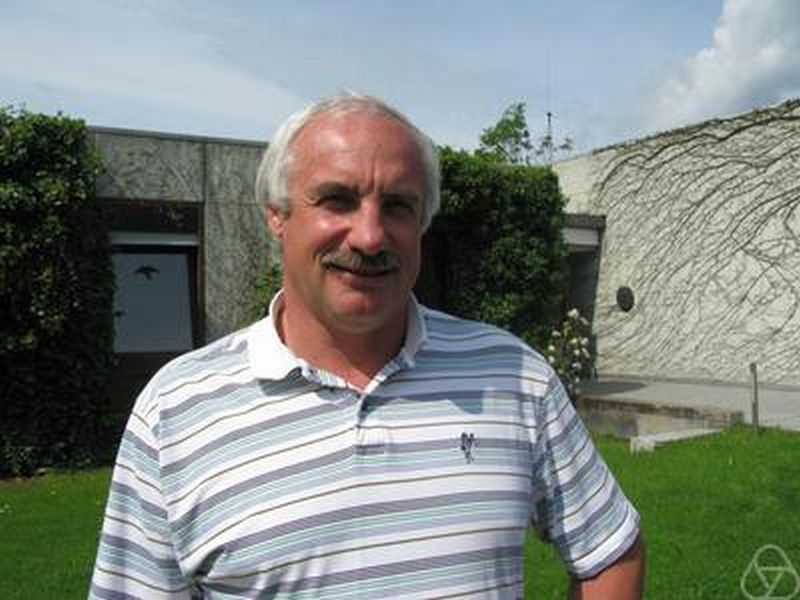
- Born: September 25, 1955 (age 70); Saint Petersburg, USSR
- Education: Leningrad University
- Known for: Merkurjev–Suslin theorem, cohomological invariants, canonical dimension, book of involutions, essential dimension
- Awards: Cole Prize in Algebra (2012); Petersburg Mathematical Society Prize (1982); Humboldt Prize (1995)
- Scientific career
- Fields: Mathematics
- Workplaces: University of California Los Angeles
- Doctoral advisor: Anatoli Yakovlev

Aleksandr Sergeyevich Merkurjev (Russian: Алекса́ндр Сергее́вич Мерку́рьев, born September 25, 1955) is a Russian-American mathematician, who has made major contributions to the field of algebra. Currently Merkurjev is a professor at the University of California, Los Angeles.

== Work ==
Merkurjev's work focuses on algebraic groups, quadratic forms, Galois cohomology, algebraic K-theory and central simple algebras. In the early 1980s Merkurjev proved a fundamental result about the structure of central simple algebras of period dividing 2, which relates the 2-torsion of the Brauer group with Milnor K-theory. In subsequent work with Suslin this was extended to higher torsion as the Merkurjev–Suslin theorem. The full statement of the norm residue isomorphism theorem (also known as the Bloch-Kato conjecture) was proven by Voevodsky.

In the late 1990s Merkurjev gave the most general approach to the notion of essential dimension, introduced by Buhler and Reichstein, and made fundamental contributions to that field. In particular Merkurjev determined the essential p-dimension of central simple algebras of degree $p^2$ (for a prime p) and, in joint work with Karpenko, the essential dimension of finite p-groups.

== Awards ==
Merkurjev won the Young Mathematician Prize of the Petersburg Mathematical Society for his work on algebraic K-theory. In 1986 he was an invited speaker at the International Congress of Mathematicians in Berkeley, California, and his talk was entitled "Milnor K-theory and Galois cohomology". In 1995 he won the Humboldt Prize, an international prize awarded to renowned scholars. Merkurjev gave a plenary talk at the second European Congress of Mathematics in Budapest, Hungary in 1996. In 2012 he won the Cole Prize in Algebra for his work on the essential dimension of groups.

In 2015 a special volume of Documenta Mathematica was published in honor of Merkurjev's sixtieth birthday.

== Bibliography ==
=== Books ===
- 1998: Max-Albert Knus, Alexander Merkurjev, Markus Rost, Jean-Pierre Tignol: The Book of Involutions, American Mathematical Society, ISBN 0-8218-0904-0
- 2003: Skip Garibaldi, Jean-Pierre Serre, Alexander Merkurjev: Cohomological Invariants in Galois Cohomology, American Mathematical Society ISBN 0-8218-3287-5
- 2008: Richard Elman, Nikita Karpenko, Alexander Merkurjev: Algebraic and geometric theory of quadratic forms, American Mathematical Society ISBN 978-0-8218-4329-1
