= Norm variety =

In mathematics, a norm variety is a particular type of algebraic variety V over a field F, introduced for the purposes of algebraic K-theory by Voevodsky. The idea is to relate Milnor K-theory of F to geometric objects V, having function fields F(V) that 'split' given 'symbols' (elements of Milnor K-groups).

The formulation is that p is a given prime number, different from the characteristic of F, and a symbol is the class mod p of an element

$$\{a_1, \dots, a_n\}\$$

of the n-th Milnor K-group. A field extension is said to split the symbol, if its image in the K-group for that field is 0.

The conditions on a norm variety V are that V is irreducible and a non-singular complete variety. Further it should have dimension d equal to

$$p^{n - 1} - 1.\$$

The key condition is in terms of the d-th Newton polynomial s_{d}, evaluated on the (algebraic) total Chern class of the tangent bundle of V. This number

$$s_d(V)\$$

should not be divisible by p^{2}, it being known it is divisible by p.

== Examples ==
These include (n = 2) cases of the Severi–Brauer variety and (p = 2) Pfister forms. There is an existence theorem in the general case (paper of Markus Rost cited).
