= List of topologies on the category of schemes =

The most fundamental item of study in modern algebraic geometry is the category of schemes. This category admits many different Grothendieck topologies, each of which is well-suited for a different purpose. This is a list of some of the topologies on the category of schemes.

- Zariski topology Essentially equivalent to the "ordinary" Zariski topology.
- Nisnevich topology Uses etale morphisms, but has an extra condition about isomorphisms between residue fields.
- Étale topology Uses etale morphisms.
- fppf topology Faithfully flat of finite presentation
- fpqc topology Faithfully flat quasicompact

- rh topology A variation of the h topology used to have a good theory of cohomology with compact support
- cdh topology rh + Nisnevich
- ldh topology used to apply Gabber's theorem on alterations
- h topology Coverings are universal topological epimorphisms. Also, h = rh + fppf.
- v-topology (also called universally subtrusive topology): coverings are maps which admit liftings for extensions of valuation rings
- qfh topology Similar to the h topology with a quasifiniteness condition. Used to encode finite correspondences topologically.
- Smooth topology Uses smooth morphisms, but is usually equivalent to the etale topology (at least for schemes).
- Canonical topology The finest such that all representable functors are sheaves.

== See also ==
- Lists of mathematics topics
- List of topologies – List of concrete topologies and topological spaces
