= Milnor K-theory =

Algebraic invariant

In mathematics, Milnor K-theory is an algebraic invariant (denoted $K_*(F)$ for a field $F$) defined by John Milnor (1970) as an attempt to study higher algebraic K-theory in the special case of fields. It was hoped this would help illuminate the structure for algebraic K-theory and give some insight about its relationships with other parts of mathematics, such as Galois cohomology and the Grothendieck–Witt ring of quadratic forms. Before Milnor K-theory was defined, there existed ad-hoc definitions for $K_1$ and $K_2$. Fortunately, it can be shown Milnor K-theory is a part of algebraic K-theory, which in general is the easiest part to compute.

== Definition ==
=== Motivation ===
After the definition of the Grothendieck group $K(R)$ of a commutative ring, it was expected there should be a sequence of invariants $K_i(R)$ called higher K-theory groups, from the fact that there exists a short exact sequence

$$K(R,I) \to K(R) \to K(R/I) \to 0$$

which should have a continuation by a long exact sequence. Note the group on the left is relative K-theory. This led to much study and as a first guess for what this theory would look like, Milnor gave a definition for fields. His definition is based upon two calculations of what higher K-theory "should" look like in degrees $1$ and $2$. Then, if in a later generalization of algebraic K-theory was given, if the generators of $K_*(R)$ lived in degree $1$ and the relations in degree $2$, then the constructions in degrees $1$ and $2$ would give the structure for the rest of the K-theory ring. Under this assumption, Milnor gave his "ad-hoc" definition. It turns out algebraic K-theory $K_*(R)$ in general has a more complex structure, but for fields the Milnor K-theory groups are contained in the general algebraic K-theory groups after tensoring with $\mathbb{Q}$, i.e. $K^M_n(F)\otimes \mathbb{Q} \subseteq K_n(F)\otimes \mathbb{Q}$. It turns out the natural map $\lambda:K^M_4(F) \to K_4(F)$ fails to be injective for a global field $F$^{pg 96}.

=== Definition ===
Note for fields the Grothendieck group can be readily computed as $K_0(F) = \mathbb{Z}$ since the only finitely generated modules are finite-dimensional vector spaces. Also, Milnor's definition of higher K-groups depends upon the canonical isomorphism

$$l\colon K_1(F) \to F^*$$

(the group of units of $F$) and observing the calculation of K_{2} of a field by Hideya Matsumoto, which gave the simple presentation

$$K_2(F) = \frac{F^*\otimes F^*}{\{l(a)\otimes l(1-a) : a \neq 0 ,1\}}$$

for a two-sided ideal generated by elements $l(a)\otimes l(a-1)$, called Steinberg relations. Milnor took the hypothesis that these were the only relations, hence he gave the following "ad-hoc" definition of Milnor K-theory as

$$K_n^M(F) = \frac{K_1(F)\otimes \cdots \otimes K_1(F)}{\{l(a_1)\otimes \cdots \otimes l(a_n) : a_i + a_{i+1} = 1 \}}.$$

The direct sum of these groups is isomorphic to a tensor algebra over the integers of the multiplicative group $K_1(F) \cong F^*$ modded out by the two-sided ideal generated by:

$$\left \{ l(a)\otimes l(1-a) : 0,1 \neq a \in F \right \}$$

so

$$\bigoplus_{n=0}^\infty K_n^M(F) \cong \frac{T^*(K_1^M(F))}{\{l(a)\otimes l(1-a) : a \neq 0,1\}}$$

showing his definition is a direct extension of the Steinberg relations.

== Properties ==
=== Ring structure ===
The graded module $K_*^M(F)$ is a graded-commutative ring^{pg 1-3}. If we write

$$(l(a_1)\otimes\cdots \otimes l(a_n))\cdot
(l(b_1)\otimes\cdots \otimes l(b_m))$$

as

$$l(a_1)\otimes\cdots \otimes l(a_n) \otimes l(b_1)\otimes\cdots \otimes l(b_m)$$

then for $\xi \in K_i^M(F)$ and $\eta \in K^M_j(F)$ we have

$$\xi \cdot \eta = (-1)^{i \cdot j}\eta \cdot \xi.$$

From the proof of this property, there are some additional properties which fall out, like
$$l(a)^2 = l(a)l(-1)$$
for $l(a) \in K_1(F)$ since $l(a)l(-a) = 0$. Also, if $a_1+\cdots + a_n$ of non-zero fields elements equals $0,1$, then
$$l(a_1)\cdots l(a_n) = 0$$
There's a direct arithmetic application: $-1 \in F$ is a sum of squares if and only if every positive dimensional $K_n^M(F)$ is nilpotent, which is a powerful statement about the structure of Milnor K-groups. In particular, for the fields $\mathbb{Q}(i)$, $\mathbb{Q}_p(i)$ with $\sqrt{-1} \not\in \mathbb{Q}_p$, all of its Milnor K-groups are nilpotent. In the converse case, the field $F$ can be embedded into a real closed field, which gives a total ordering on the field.

=== Relation to Higher Chow groups and Quillen's higher K-theory ===
One of the core properties relating Milnor K-theory to higher algebraic K-theory is the fact there exists natural isomorphisms
$$K_n^M(F) \to \text{CH}^{n}(F,n)$$
to Bloch's Higher chow groups which induces a morphism of graded rings
$$K_*^M(F) \to \text{CH}^*(F,*)$$
This can be verified using an explicit morphism^{pg 181}
$$\phi:F^* \to \text{CH}^1(F,1)$$
where
$$\phi(a)\phi(1-a) = 0 ~\text{in}~ \text{CH}^2(F,2) ~\text{for}~ a,1-a \in F^*$$
This map is given by
$$\begin{align}
\{1\} &\mapsto 0 \in \text{CH}^1(F,1) \\
\{a\} &\mapsto [a] \in \text{CH}^1(F,1)
\end{align}$$
for $[a]$ the class of the point $[a:1] \in \mathbb{P}^1_F-\{0,1,\infty \}$ with $a \in F^*-\{1\}$. The main property to check is that $[a] + [1/a] = 0$ for $a \in F^*-\{1\}$ and $[a] + [b] = [ab]$. Note this is distinct from $[a]\cdot [b]$ since this is an element in $\text{CH}^2(F,2)$. Also, the second property implies the first for $b = 1/a$. This check can be done using a rational curve defining a cycle in $C^1(F,2)$ whose image under the boundary map $\partial$ is the sum $[a] + [b] - [ab]$for $ab \neq 1$, showing they differ by a boundary. Similarly, if $ab=1$ the boundary map sends this cycle to $[a] - [1/a]$, showing they differ by a boundary. The second main property to show is the Steinberg relations. With these, and the fact the higher Chow groups have a ring structure
$$\text{CH}^p(F,q) \otimes \text{CH}^r(F,s) \to \text{CH}^{p+r}(F,q+s)$$
we get an explicit map
$$K_*^M(F) \to \text{CH}^*(F,*)$$
Showing the map in the reverse direction is an isomorphism is more work, but we get the isomorphisms
$$K_n^M(F) \to \text{CH}^n(F,n)$$
We can then relate the higher Chow groups to higher algebraic K-theory using the fact there are isomorphisms
$$K_n(X)\otimes \mathbb{Q} \cong \bigoplus_p \text{CH}^p(X,n)\otimes \mathbb{Q}$$
giving the relation to Quillen's higher algebraic K-theory. Note that the maps

$$K^M_n(F) \to K_n(F)$$

from the Milnor K-groups of a field to the Quillen K-groups, which is an isomorphism for $n\le 2$ but not for larger n, in general. For nonzero elements $a_1, \ldots, a_n$ in F, the symbol $\{a_1, \ldots, a_n\}$ in $K_n^M(F)$ means the image of $a_1 \otimes \cdots \otimes a_n$ in the tensor algebra. Every element of Milnor K-theory can be written as a finite sum of symbols. The fact that $\{a, 1-a\} = 0$ in $K_2^M(F)$ for $a \in F\setminus \{0,1\}$ is sometimes called the Steinberg relation.

=== Representation in motivic cohomology ===
In motivic cohomology, specifically motivic homotopy theory, there is a sheaf $K_{n,A}$ representing a generalization of Milnor K-theory with coefficients in an abelian group $A$. If we denote $A_{tr}(X) = \mathbb{Z}_{tr}(X)\otimes A$ then we define the sheaf $K_{n,A}$ as the sheafification of the following pre-sheaf^{pg 4}
$$K_{n,A}^{pre}: U \mapsto A_{tr}(\mathbb{A}^n)(U)/A_{tr}(\mathbb{A}^n - \{0\})(U)$$
Note that sections of this pre-sheaf are equivalent classes of cycles on $U\times\mathbb{A}^n$ with coefficients in $A$ which are equidimensional and finite over $U$ (which follows straight from the definition of $\mathbb{Z}_{tr}(X)$). It can be shown there is an $\mathbb{A}^1$-weak equivalence with the motivic Eilenberg-Maclane sheaves $K(A, 2n,n)$ (depending on the grading convention).

== Examples ==
=== Finite fields ===
For a finite field $F = \mathbb{F}_q$, $K_1^M(F)$ is a cyclic group of order $q-1$ (since is it isomorphic to $\mathbb{F}_q^*$), so graded commutativity gives
$$l(a)\cdot l(b) = -l(b)\cdot l(a)$$
hence
$$l(a)^2 =-l(a) ^2$$
Because $K_2^M(F)$ is a finite group, this implies it must have order $\leq 2$. Looking further, $1$ can always be expressed as a sum of quadratic non-residues, i.e. elements $a,b \in F$ such that $[a],[b] \in F/F^{\times 2}$ are not equal to $0$, hence $a + b = 1$ showing $K_2^M(F) = 0$. Because the Steinberg relations generate all relations in the Milnor K-theory ring, we have $K_n^M(F) = 0$ for $n > 2$.

=== Real numbers ===
For the field of real numbers $\mathbb{R}$ the Milnor K-theory groups can be readily computed. In degree $n$ the group is generated by
$$K_n^M(\mathbb{R}) = \{(-1)^n, l(a_1)\cdots l(a_n) : a_1,\ldots, a_n > 0 \}$$
where $(-1)^n$ gives a group of order $2$ and the subgroup generated by the $l(a_1)\cdots l(a_n)$ is divisible. The subgroup generated by $(-1)^n$ is not divisible because otherwise it could be expressed as a sum of squares. The Milnor K-theory ring is important in the study of motivic homotopy theory because it gives generators for part of the motivic Steenrod algebra. The others are lifts from the classical Steenrod operations to motivic cohomology.

=== Other calculations ===
$K^M_2(\Complex)$ is an uncountable uniquely divisible group. Also, $K^M_2(\R)$ is the direct sum of a cyclic group of order 2 and an uncountable uniquely divisible group; $K^M_2(\Q_p)$ is the direct sum of the multiplicative group of $\mathbb{F}_p$ and an uncountable uniquely divisible group; $K^M_2(\Q)$ is the direct sum of the cyclic group of order 2 and cyclic groups of order $p-1$ for all odd prime $p$. For $n \geq 3$, $K_n^M(\mathbb{Q}) \cong \mathbb{Z}/2$. The full proof is in the appendix of Milnor's original paper. Some of the computation can be seen by looking at a map on $K_2^M(F)$ induced from the inclusion of a global field $F$ to its completions $F_v$, so there is a morphism
$$K_2^M(F) \to \bigoplus_{v} K_2^M(F_v)/(\text{max. divis. subgr.})$$
whose kernel finitely generated. In addition, the cokernel is isomorphic to the roots of unity in $F$.

In addition, for a general local field $F$ (such as a finite extension $K/\mathbb{Q}_p$), the Milnor K-groups $K_n^M(F)$ are divisible.

=== K_{*}^{M}(F(t)) ===
There is a general structure theorem computing $K_n^M(F(t))$ for a field $F$ in relation to the Milnor K-theory of $F$ and extensions $F[t]/(\pi)$ for non-zero primes ideals $(\pi) \in \text{Spec}(F[t])$. This is given by an exact sequence
$$0 \to K_n^M(F) \to K_n^M(F(t)) \xrightarrow{\partial_\pi} \bigoplus_{(\pi) \in \text{Spec}(F[t])} K_{n-1}F[t]/(\pi) \to 0$$
where $\partial_\pi : K_n^M(F(t)) \to K_{n-1}F[t]/(\pi)$ is a morphism constructed from a reduction of $F$ to $\overline{F}_v$ for a discrete valuation $v$. This follows from the theorem there exists only one homomorphism
$$\partial:K_n^M(F) \to K_{n-1}^M(\overline{F})$$
which for the group of units $U \subset F$ which are elements have valuation $0$, having a natural morphism
$$U \to \overline{F}_v^*$$
where $u \mapsto \overline{u}$ we have
$$\partial(l(\pi)l(u_2)\cdots l(u_n)) = l(\overline{u}_2)\cdots  l(\overline{u}_n)$$
where $\pi$ a prime element, meaning $\text{Ord}_v(\pi) = 1$, and
$$\partial(l(u_1)\cdots l(u_n)) = 0$$
Since every non-zero prime ideal $(\pi) \in \text{Spec}(F[t])$ gives a valuation $v_\pi : F(t) \to F[t]/(\pi)$, we get the map $\partial_\pi$ on the Milnor K-groups.

== Applications ==
Milnor K-theory plays a fundamental role in higher class field theory, replacing $K_1^M(F) = F^{\times}\!$ in the one-dimensional class field theory.

Milnor K-theory fits into the broader context of motivic cohomology, via the isomorphism

$$K^M_n(F) \cong H^n(F, \Z(n))$$

of the Milnor K-theory of a field with a certain motivic cohomology group. In this sense, the apparently ad hoc definition of Milnor K-theory becomes a theorem: certain motivic cohomology groups of a field can be explicitly computed by generators and relations.

A much deeper result, the Bloch-Kato conjecture (also called the norm residue isomorphism theorem), relates Milnor K-theory to Galois cohomology or étale cohomology:

$$K^M_n(F)/r \cong H^n_{\mathrm{et}}(F, \Z/r(n)),$$

for any positive integer r invertible in the field F. This conjecture was proved by Vladimir Voevodsky, with contributions by Markus Rost and others. This includes the theorem of Alexander Merkurjev and Andrei Suslin as well as the Milnor conjecture as special cases (the cases when $n = 2$ and $r = 2$, respectively).

Finally, there is a relation between Milnor K-theory and quadratic forms. For a field F of characteristic not 2, define the fundamental ideal I in the Witt ring of quadratic forms over F to be the kernel of the homomorphism $W(F) \to\Z/2$ given by the dimension of a quadratic form, modulo 2. Milnor defined a homomorphism:

$$\begin{cases} K_n^M(F)/2 \to I^n/I^{n+1} \\ \{a_1, \ldots, a_n \} \mapsto \langle \langle a_1, \ldots , a_n \rangle \rangle = \langle 1, -a_1 \rangle \otimes \cdots \otimes \langle 1, -a_n \rangle \end{cases}$$

where $\langle \langle a_1, a_2, \ldots , a_n \rangle \rangle$ denotes the class of the n-fold Pfister form.

Dmitri Orlov, Alexander Vishik, and Voevodsky proved another statement called the Milnor conjecture, namely that this homomorphism $K_n^M(F)/2 \to I^n/I^{n+1}$ is an isomorphism.

== See also ==
- Azumaya algebra
- Motivic homotopy theory
