= Ivan Panin (mathematician) =

Russian mathematician (born 1959)

Ivan Aleksandrovich Panin (Иван Александрович Панин, born 2 July 1959 in Apatity, Russia) is a Russian mathematician, specializing in algebra, algebraic geometry, and algebraic K-theory.

== Education and career ==
In 1973 he entered boarding school at D. K. Faddeev Academic Gymnasium and graduated there in 1976 There he graduated in 1981 from the Faculty of Mathematics and Mechanics of Saint Petersburg State University. At the St. Petersburg Department of Steklov Institute of Mathematics of Russian Academy of Sciences (abbreviated ПОМИ им. В. А. Стеклова РАН in Russian), he defended in 1984 his thesis for the degree of candidate of physical and mathematical sciences (Ph.D.) with supervisor Andrei Suslin and then became employed there as a staff member. Panin received in 1996 the degree of Doctor nauk from the St. Petersburg Department of Steklov Institute of Mathematics of Russian Academy of Sciences. There in 1999 he became the head of the laboratory of algebra and number theory. In 2003 he was elected a corresponding member of the Russian Academy of Sciences in the Department of Mathematical Sciences. In 2018 in Rio de Janeiro he was an invited speaker at the International Congress of Mathematicians.

== Research ==
The main directions of I. A. Panin's work are the theory of oriented cohomology on algebraic varieties, algebraic K-theory of homogeneous varieties, Gersten's conjecture, the Grothendieck-Serre conjecture on principal G-bundles, and purity in algebraic geometry.

I. A. Panin proved (together with A. L. Smirnov) theorems of the Riemann-Roch type for oriented cohomology theories and Riemann-Roch type theorems for the Adams operation. Panin found a proof of Gersten's conjecture in the case of equal characteristic and an affirmative solution (jointly with Manuel Ojanguren) of the "purity" problem for quadratic forms.

Panin computed the algebraic K-groups of all twisted forms of flag varieties and all principal homogeneous spaces over the inner forms of semisimple algebraic groups. He, jointly with A. S. Merkurjev and A. R. Wadsworth, generalized, to arbitrary Borel varieties, results proved by David Tao concerning index reduction formulas for the function fields of involution varieties.

== Selected publications ==
- Panin I. A. (1994). "On the algebraic K-theory of twisted flag varieties". K-Theory. 8 (6): 541–585. doi:10.1007/BF00961020.
- Merkurjev A. S., Panin I. A., Wadsworth A. R. (1996). "Index reduction formulas for twisted flag varieties". K-Theory. 10 (6): 517–596. doi:10.1007/BF00537543.
- Панин И. А. (1998). "Принцип расщепления и K-теория односвязных полупростых алгебраических групп (The splitting principle and the K-theory of simply connected semisimple algebraic groups)" (PDF). Алгебра и анализ. 10 (1): 88–131.
- Ojanguren M., Panin I. (1999). "A purity theorem for the Witt group" (PDF). Ann. Sci. École Norm. Sup. 32 (1): 71–86. doi:10.1016/s0012-9593(99)80009-3.
- Panin, Ivan; Pimenov, Konstantin; Röndigs, Oliver (2009). "On Voevodsky's Algebraic K-Theory Spectrum". In Baas, N.; Friedlander, E.; Jahren, B.; Østvær, P. (eds.). Algebraic Topology. Abel Symposia, Vol. 4. Springer. pp. 279–330. doi:10.1007/978-3-642-01200-6_10. ISBN 978-3-642-01199-3. S2CID 15407424.
