= Milnor conjecture (K-theory) =

Theorem describing the Milnor K-theory (mod 2) by means of the Galois cohomology

In mathematics, the Milnor conjecture was a proposal by John Milnor (1970) of a description of the Milnor K-theory (mod 2) of a general field F with characteristic different from 2, by means of the Galois (or equivalently étale) cohomology of F with coefficients in Z/2Z. It was proved by Vladimir Voevodsky (1996, 2003a, 2003b).

== Statement ==
Let F be a field of characteristic different from 2. Then there is an isomorphism

$$K_n^M(F)/2 \cong H_{\acute{e}t}^n(F, \mathbb{Z}/2\mathbb{Z})$$

for all n ≥ 0, where K^{M} denotes the Milnor ring.

== About the proof ==
The proof of this theorem by Vladimir Voevodsky uses several ideas developed by Voevodsky, Alexander Merkurjev, Andrei Suslin, Markus Rost, Fabien Morel, Eric Friedlander, and others, including the newly minted theory of motivic cohomology (a kind of substitute for singular cohomology for algebraic varieties) and the motivic Steenrod algebra.

== Generalizations ==
The analogue of this result for primes other than 2 was known as the Bloch–Kato conjecture. Work of Voevodsky and Markus Rost yielded a complete proof of this conjecture in 2009; the result is now called the norm residue isomorphism theorem.
