= Quillen–Lichtenbaum conjecture =

Mathematical conjecture

In mathematics, the Quillen–Lichtenbaum conjecture is a conjecture relating étale cohomology to algebraic K-theory introduced by Quillen (1975, p. 175), who was inspired by earlier conjectures of Lichtenbaum (1973). Kahn (1997) and Rognes & Weibel (2000) proved the Quillen–Lichtenbaum conjecture at the prime 2 for some number fields. Voevodsky, using some important results of Markus Rost, proved the Bloch–Kato conjecture, which implies the Quillen–Lichtenbaum conjecture for all primes.

== Statement ==
The conjecture in Quillen's original form states that if A is a finitely-generated algebra over the integers and l is prime, then there is a spectral sequence analogous to the Atiyah–Hirzebruch spectral sequence, starting at

$E_2^{pq} = H^p_{\text{etale}}(\text{Spec }A[\ell^{-1}], Z_\ell(-q/2)),$ (which is understood to be 0 if q is odd)

and abutting to

$$K_{-p-q}A\otimes Z_\ell$$

for −p − q > 1 + dim A.

== K-theory of the integers ==
Assuming the Quillen–Lichtenbaum conjecture and the Vandiver conjecture, the K-groups of the integers, K_{n}(Z), are given by:

- 0 if n = 0 mod 8 and n > 0, Z if n = 0
- Z ⊕ Z/2 if n = 1 mod 8 and n > 1, Z/2 if n = 1.
- Z/c_{k} ⊕ Z/2 if n = 2 mod 8
- Z/8d_{k} if n = 3 mod 8
- 0 if n = 4 mod 8
- Z if n = 5 mod 8
- Z/c_{k} if n = 6 mod 8
- Z/4d_{k} if n = 7 mod 8

where c_{k}/d_{k} is the Bernoulli number B_{2k}/k in lowest terms and n is 4k − 1 or 4k − 2 (Weibel 2005).
