= Pfister form =

Multiplicative quadratic form

In mathematics, a Pfister form is a particular kind of quadratic form, introduced by Albrecht Pfister in 1965. In what follows, quadratic forms are considered over a field F of characteristic not 2. For a natural number n, an n-fold Pfister form over F is a quadratic form of dimension 2^{n} that can be written as a tensor product of quadratic forms

$$\langle\!\langle a_1, a_2, \ldots , a_n \rangle\!\rangle \cong \langle 1, -a_1 \rangle \otimes \langle 1, -a_2 \rangle \otimes \cdots \otimes \langle 1, -a_n \rangle,$$

for some nonzero elements a_{1}, ..., a_{n} of F. (Some authors omit the signs in this definition; the notation here simplifies the relation to Milnor K-theory, discussed below.) An n-fold Pfister form can also be constructed inductively from an (n−1)-fold Pfister form q and a nonzero element a of F, as $q \oplus (-a)q$.

So the 1-fold and 2-fold Pfister forms look like:

$$\langle\!\langle a\rangle\!\rangle\cong \langle 1, -a \rangle = x^2 - ay^2$$.
$$\langle\!\langle a,b\rangle\!\rangle\cong \langle 1, -a, -b, ab \rangle = x^2 - ay^2 - bz^2 + abw^2.$$

For n ≤ 3, the n-fold Pfister forms are norm forms of composition algebras. In that case, two n-fold Pfister forms are isomorphic if and only if the corresponding composition algebras are isomorphic. In particular, this gives the classification of octonion algebras.

The n-fold Pfister forms additively generate the n-th power I^{n} of the fundamental ideal of the Witt ring of F.

== Characterizations ==
A quadratic form q over a field F is multiplicative if, for vectors of indeterminates x and y, we can write q(x).q(y) = q(z) for some vector z of rational functions in the x and y over F. Isotropic quadratic forms are multiplicative. For anisotropic quadratic forms, Pfister forms are multiplicative, and conversely.

For n-fold Pfister forms with n ≤ 3, this had been known since the 19th century; in that case z can be taken to be bilinear in x and y, by the properties of composition algebras. It was a remarkable discovery by Pfister that n-fold Pfister forms for all n are multiplicative in the more general sense here, involving rational functions. For example, he deduced that for any field F and any natural number n, the set of sums of 2^{n} squares in F is closed under multiplication, using that the quadratic form $x_1^2 +\cdots + x_{2^n}^2$ is an n-fold Pfister form (namely, $\langle\!\langle -1, \ldots , -1 \rangle\!\rangle$).

Another striking feature of Pfister forms is that every isotropic Pfister form is in fact hyperbolic, that is, isomorphic to a direct sum of copies of the hyperbolic plane $\langle 1, -1 \rangle$. This property also characterizes Pfister forms, as follows: If q is an anisotropic quadratic form over a field F, and if q becomes hyperbolic over every extension field E such that q becomes isotropic over E, then q is isomorphic to aφ for some nonzero a in F and some Pfister form φ over F.

== Connection with K-theory ==
Let k_{n}(F) be the n-th Milnor K-group modulo 2. There is a homomorphism from k_{n}(F) to the quotient I^{n}/I^{n+1} in the Witt ring of F, given by

$$\{a_1,\ldots,a_n\} \mapsto \langle\!\langle a_1, a_2, \ldots , a_n \rangle\!\rangle ,$$

where the image is an n-fold Pfister form. The homomorphism is surjective, since the Pfister forms additively generate I^{n}. One part of the Milnor conjecture, proved by Orlov, Vishik and Voevodsky, states that this homomorphism is in fact an isomorphism k_{n}(F) ≅ I^{n}/I^{n+1}. That gives an explicit description of the abelian group I^{n}/I^{n+1} by generators and relations. The other part of the Milnor conjecture, proved by Voevodsky, says that k_{n}(F) (and hence I^{n}/I^{n+1}) maps isomorphically to the Galois cohomology group H^{n}(F, F_{2}).

== Pfister neighbors ==
A Pfister neighbor is an anisotropic form σ which is isomorphic to a subform of aφ for some nonzero a in F and some Pfister form φ with dim φ < 2 dim σ. The associated Pfister form φ is determined up to isomorphism by σ. Every anisotropic form of dimension 3 is a Pfister neighbor; an anisotropic form of dimension 4 is a Pfister neighbor if and only if its discriminant in F^{*}/(F^{*})^{2} is trivial. A field F has the property that every 5-dimensional anisotropic form over F is a Pfister neighbor if and only if it is a linked field.
