= Azumaya =

Azumaya may refer to:

- Goro Azumaya (東屋 五郎) (1920–2010), Japanese mathematician
  - Azumaya algebra
- Mount Azumaya (四阿山, Azumaya-san), mountain in Nagano Prefecture and Gunma Prefecture, Japan
- An azumaya is a traditional arbour or summer pavilion found in formal Japanese gardens
