= Kummer–Vandiver conjecture =

- Field: Algebraic number theory
- Conjectured by: Ernst Kummer
- Conjectured in: 1849
- Open problem: Yes

In mathematics, the Kummer–Vandiver conjecture, or Vandiver conjecture, states that a prime $p$ does not divide the class number $h_K$ of the maximal real subfield $K = \mathbb{Q}(\zeta_p)^+$ of the $p$-th cyclotomic field. The conjecture was first made by Ernst Kummer, on 28 December 1849 and 24 April 1853 in letters to Leopold Kronecker, and independently rediscovered around 1920 by Philipp Furtwängler and Harry Vandiver.

As of 2011, there is no particularly strong evidence either for or against the conjecture and it is unclear whether it is true or false, though it is likely that counterexamples are very rare.

== Background ==
The class number $h$ of the cyclotomic field $\mathbb{Q}(\zeta_p)$ is a product of two integers $h_1$ and $h_2$, called the first and second factors of the class number, where $h_2$ is the class number of the maximal real subfield $K = \mathbb{Q}(\zeta_p)^+$ of the $p$-th cyclotomic field. The first factor $h_1$ is well understood and can be computed easily in terms of Bernoulli numbers, and is usually rather large. The second factor $h_2$ is not well understood and is hard to compute explicitly, and in the cases when it has been computed it is usually small.

Kummer showed that if a prime $p$ does not divide the class number $h$, then Fermat's Last Theorem holds for exponent $p$.

The Kummer–Vandiver conjecture states that $p$ does not divide the second factor $h_2$. Kummer showed that if $p$ divides the second factor, then it also divides the first factor. In particular the Kummer–Vandiver conjecture holds for regular primes (those for which $p$ does not divide the first factor).

== Evidence for and against the Kummer–Vandiver conjecture ==
Kummer verified the Kummer–Vandiver conjecture for $p$ less than 200, and Vandiver extended this to $p$ less than 600. Buhler, Crandall et al. verified it for p < 12000000. Buhler and Harvey extended this to primes less than 163000000, and Hart, Harvey, and Ong extended this to primes less than 2^{31}.

Washington describes an informal probability argument, based on rather dubious assumptions about the equidistribution of class numbers modulo $p$, suggesting that the number of primes less than $x$ that are exceptions to the Kummer–Vandiver conjecture might grow like $(\log\log x)/2$. This grows extremely slowly, and suggests that the computer calculations do not provide much evidence for Vandiver's conjecture: for example, the probability argument (combined with the calculations for small primes) suggests that one should only expect about 1 counterexample in the first 10^{100} primes, suggesting that it is unlikely any counterexample will be found by further brute force searches even if there are an infinite number of exceptions.

Schoof gave conjectural calculations of the class numbers of real cyclotomic fields for primes up to 10000, which strongly suggest that the class numbers are not randomly distributed mod $p$. They tend to be quite small and are often just $1$. For example, assuming the generalized Riemann hypothesis, the class number of the real cyclotomic field for the prime $p$ is $1$ for $p<163$, and divisible by $4$ for $p=163$. This suggests that Washington's informal probability argument against the conjecture may be misleading.

Mihăilescu gave a refined version of Washington's heuristic argument, suggesting that the Kummer–Vandiver conjecture is probably true.

== Consequences of the Kummer–Vandiver conjecture ==
Kurihara showed that the conjecture is equivalent to a statement in the algebraic K-theory of the integers, namely that $K_n(\Z)=0$ whenever $n$ is a multiple of $4$. In fact, from the Kummer–Vandiver conjecture and the norm residue isomorphism theorem follows a full conjectural calculation of the $K$-groups for all values of $n$; see Quillen–Lichtenbaum conjecture for details.

== See also ==
- Regular and irregular primes
- Herbrand–Ribet theorem
