= Algebraic cobordism =

In mathematics, algebraic cobordism is an analogue of complex cobordism for smooth quasi-projective schemes over a field. It was introduced by Marc Levine and Fabien Morel (2001, 2001b).

An oriented cohomology theory on the category of smooth quasi-projective schemes Sm over a field k consists of a contravariant functor A* from Sm to commutative graded rings, together with push-forward maps f_{*} whenever f:Y→X has relative dimension d for some d. These maps have to satisfy various conditions similar to those satisfied by complex cobordism. In particular they are "oriented", which means roughly that they behave well on vector bundles; this is closely related to the condition that a generalized cohomology theory has a complex orientation.

Over a field of characteristic 0, algebraic cobordism is the universal oriented cohomology theory for smooth varieties. In other words there is a unique morphism of oriented cohomology theories from algebraic cobordism to any other oriented cohomology theory.

Levine (2002) and Levine & Morel (2007) give surveys of algebraic cobordism.

The algebraic cobordism ring of generalized flag varieties has been computed by Hornbostel & Kiritchenko (2011).
