= A¹ homotopy theory =

Application of homotopy to algebraic varieties

In algebraic geometry and algebraic topology, branches of mathematics, A^{1} homotopy theory or motivic homotopy theory is a way to apply the techniques of algebraic topology, specifically homotopy, to algebraic varieties and, more generally, to schemes. The theory is due to Fabien Morel and Vladimir Voevodsky. The underlying idea is that it should be possible to develop a purely algebraic approach to homotopy theory by replacing the unit interval [0, 1], which is not an algebraic variety, with the affine line A^{1}, which is. The theory has seen spectacular applications such as Voevodsky's construction of the derived category of mixed motives and the proof of the Milnor and Bloch-Kato conjectures. It has also recently revolutionized the theory of enumerative geometry problems.

== Construction ==
A^{1} homotopy theory is founded on a category called the A^{1} homotopy category $\mathcal{H}(S)$. Simply put, the A^{1} homotopy category, or rather the canonical functor $Sm_S \to \mathcal{H}(S)$, is the universal functor from the category $Sm_S$ of smooth $S$-schemes towards an infinity category which satisfies Nisnevich descent, such that the affine line A^{1} becomes contractible. Here $S$ is some prechosen base scheme (e.g., the spectrum of the complex numbers $Spec(\mathbb C)$).

This definition in terms of a universal property is not possible without infinity categories. These were not available in the 90's and the original definition passes by way of Quillen's theory of model categories. Another way of seeing the situation is that Morel-Voevodsky's original definition produces a concrete model for (the homotopy category of) the infinity category $\mathcal{H}(S)$.

This more concrete construction is sketched below.

=== Step 0 ===
Choose a base scheme $S$. Classically, $S$ is asked to be Noetherian, but many modern authors such as Marc Hoyois work with quasi-compact quasi-separated base schemes. In any event, many important results are only known over a perfect base field, such as the complex numbers, so we consider only this case.

=== Step 1 ===
Step 1a: Nisnevich sheaves. Classically, the construction begins with the category $Shv_{Nis}(Sm_S)$ of Nisnevich sheaves on the category $Sm_S$ of smooth schemes over $S$. Heuristically, this should be considered as (and in a precise technical sense is) the universal enlargement of $Sm_S$ obtained by adjoining all colimits and forcing Nisnevich descent to be satisfied.

Step 1b: simplicial sheaves. In order to more easily perform standard homotopy theoretic procedures such as homotopy colimits and homotopy limits, $Shv_{Nis}(Sm_S)$ replaced with the following category of simplicial sheaves.

Let Δ be the simplex category, that is, the category whose objects are the sets

{0}, {0, 1}, {0, 1, 2}, ...,

and whose morphisms are order-preserving functions. We let $\Delta^{op}Shv(Sm_S)_{Nis}$ denote the category of functors $\Delta^{op} \to Shv(Sm_S)_{Nis}$. That is, $\Delta^{op}Shv(Sm_S)_{Nis}$ is the category of simplicial objects on $Shv(Sm_S)_{Nis}$. Such an object is also called a simplicial sheaf on $Sm_S$.

Step 1c: fibre functors. For any smooth $S$-scheme $X$, any point $x \in X$, and any sheaf $F$, let's write $x^*F$ for the stalk of the restriction $F|_{X_{Nis}}$ of $F$ to the small Nisnevich site of $X$. Explicitly, $x^*F = colim_{x \to V \to X} F(V)$ where the colimit is over factorisations $x \to V \to X$ of the canonical inclusion $x \to X$ via an étale morphism $V \to X$. The collection $\{x^*\}$ is a conservative family of fibre functors for $Shv(Sm_S)_{Nis}$.

Step 1d: the closed model structure. We will define a closed model structure on $\Delta^{op}Shv(Sm_S)_{Nis}$ in terms of fibre functors. Let $f : \mathcal{X} \to \mathcal{Y}$ be a morphism of simplicial sheaves. We say that:

- f is a weak equivalence if, for any fibre functor x of T, the morphism of simplicial sets $x^*f : x^*\mathcal{X} \to x^*\mathcal{Y}$ is a weak equivalence.
- f is a cofibration if it is a monomorphism.
- f is a fibration if it has the right lifting property with respect to any cofibration which is a weak equivalence.

The homotopy category of this model structure is denoted $\mathcal{H}_s(T)$.

=== Step 2 ===
This model structure has Nisnevich descent, but it does not contract the affine line. A simplicial sheaf $\mathcal{X}$ is called $\mathbb A^1$-local if for any simplicial sheaf $\mathcal{Y}$ the map

$$\text{Hom}_{\mathcal{H}_s(T)}(\mathcal{Y} \times \mathbb A^1, \mathcal{X}) \to \text{Hom}_{\mathcal{H}_s(T)}(\mathcal{Y}, \mathcal{X})$$

induced by $i_0: \{0\} \to \mathbb A^1$ is a bijection. Here we are considering $\mathbb A^1$ as a sheaf via the Yoneda embedding, and the constant simplicial object functor $Shv(Sm_S)_{Nis} \to \Delta^{op}Shv(Sm_S)_{Nis}$.

A morphism $f : \mathcal{X} \to \mathcal{Y}$ is an $\mathbb A^1$-weak equivalence if for any $\mathbb A^1$-local $\mathcal{Z}$, the induced map

$$\text{Hom}_{\mathcal{H}_s(T)} (\mathcal{Y}, \mathcal{Z}) \to \text{Hom}_{\mathcal{H}_s(T)} (\mathcal{X}, \mathcal{Z})$$

is a bijection. The $\mathbb A^1$-local model structure is the localisation of the above model with respect to $\mathbb A^1$-weak equivalences.

=== Formal Definition ===
Finally we may define the A^{1} homotopy category.

Definition. Let S be a finite-dimensional Noetherian scheme (for example $S = Spec(\mathbb C)$ the spectrum of the complex numbers), and let Sm_{/S} denote the category of smooth schemes over S. Equip Sm_{/S} with the Nisnevich topology to get the site (Sm_{/S})_{Nis}. The homotopy category (or infinity category) associated to the $\mathbb A^1$-local model structure on $\Delta^{op}Shv_*(Sm_S)_{Nis}$ is called the A^{1}-homotopy category. It is denoted $\mathcal{H}_s$. Similarly, for the pointed simplicial sheaves $\Delta^{op}Shv_*(Sm_S)_{Nis}$ there is an associated pointed homotopy category $\mathcal{H}_{s, *}$.

Note that by construction, for any X in Sm_{/S}, there is an isomorphism

X ×_{S} A^{1}_{S} ≅ X,

in the homotopy category.

== Properties of the theory ==
=== Wedge and smash products of simplicial (pre)sheaves ===
Because we started with a simplicial model category to construct the $\mathbf{A}^1$-homotopy category, there are a number of structures inherited from the abstract theory of simplicial models categories. In particular, for $\mathcal{X},\mathcal{Y}$ pointed simplicial sheaves in $\Delta^{op}\text{Sh}_*(\text{Sm}/S)_{nis}$ we can form the wedge product as the colimit

$$\mathcal{X}\vee \mathcal{Y} = \underset{\to}{\text{colim}}\left\{
\begin{matrix}
* & \to & \mathcal{X} \\
\downarrow  & & \\
\mathcal{Y}
\end{matrix}
\right\}$$

and the smash product is defined as

$\mathcal{X}\wedge \mathcal{Y} = \mathcal{X}\times \mathcal{Y} / \mathcal{X}\vee \mathcal{Y}$

recovering some of the classical constructions in homotopy theory. There is in addition a cone of a simplicial (pre)sheaf and a cone of a morphism, but defining these requires the definition of the simplicial spheres.

==== Simplicial spheres ====
From the fact we start with a simplicial model category, this means there is a cosimplicial functor

$\Delta^\bullet: \Delta \to \Delta^{op}{\text{Sh}}_{*}({\text{Sm}}/S)_{nis}$

defining the simplices in $\Delta^{op}\text{Sh}_*(\text{Sm}/S)_{nis}$. Recall the algebraic n-simplex is given by the $S$-scheme

$\Delta^n = \text{Spec}\left( \frac{ \mathcal{O}_S[t_0,t_1,\ldots, t_n] }{(t_0 + t_1 + \cdots +t_n - 1)} \right)$

Embedding these schemes as constant presheaves and sheafifying gives objects in $\Delta^{op}\text{Sh}_*(\text{Sm}/S)_{nis}$, which we denote by $\Delta^n$. These are the objects in the image of $\Delta^\bullet([n])$, i.e. $\Delta^\bullet([n]) = \Delta^n$. Then using abstract simplicial homotopy theory, we get the simplicial spheres

$S^n = \Delta^n/\partial\Delta^n$

We can then form the cone of a simplicial (pre)sheaf as

$C(\mathcal{X}) = \mathcal{X}\wedge \Delta^1$

and form the cone of a morphism $f:\mathcal{X} \to \mathcal{Y}$ as the colimit of the diagram

$$C(f) = \underset{\to}{\text{colim}}\left\{
\begin{matrix}
\mathcal{X} & \xrightarrow{f} & \mathcal{Y} \\
\downarrow  & & \\
C(\mathcal{X})
\end{matrix}
\right\}$$

In addition, the cofiber of $\mathcal{Y} \to C(f)$ is simply the suspension $\mathcal{X}\wedge S^1 = \Sigma \mathcal{X}$. In the pointed homotopy category there is additionally the suspension functor

$\Sigma: \mathcal{H}_{s, *}(Sm/S)_{Nis} \to \mathcal{H}_{s, *}(Sm/S)_{Nis}$ given by $\Sigma(\mathcal{X}) = \mathcal{X}\wedge S^1$

and its right adjoint

$\Omega: \mathcal{H}_{s, *}(Sm/S)_{Nis}\to \mathcal{H}_{s, *}(Sm/S)_{Nis}$

called the loop space functor.

=== Remarks ===
The setup, especially the Nisnevich topology, is chosen as to make algebraic K-theory representable by a spectrum, and in some aspects to make a proof of the Bloch-Kato conjecture possible.

After the Morel-Voevodsky construction there have been several different approaches to A^{1} homotopy theory by using other model category structures or by using other sheaves than Nisnevich sheaves (for example, Zariski sheaves or just all presheaves). Each of these constructions yields the same homotopy category.

There are two kinds of spheres in the theory: those coming from the multiplicative group playing the role of the 1-sphere in topology, and those coming from the simplicial sphere (considered as constant simplicial sheaf). This leads to a theory of motivic spheres S^{p,q} with two indices. To compute the homotopy groups of motivic spheres would also yield the classical stable homotopy groups of the spheres, so in this respect A^{1} homotopy theory is at least as complicated as classical homotopy theory.

== Uses ==
Mathematicians have recently discovered a way to apply motivic homotopy theory to enumerative geometry problems in a very general way, producing quadratic forms from enumerative geometry problems which can be used to derive information about their solutions in all number systems.

== Motivic analogies ==
=== Eilenberg-Maclane spaces ===
For an abelian group $A$ the $(p,q)$-motivic cohomology of a smooth scheme $X$ is given by the sheaf hypercohomology groups

$H^{p,q}(X,A):= \mathbb{H}^{p}(X_{nis}, A(q))$

for $A(q) = \mathbb{Z}(q)\otimes A$. Representing this cohomology is a simplicial abelian sheaf denoted $K(p,q,A)$ corresponding to $A(q)[+p]$ which is considered as an object in the pointed motivic homotopy category $H_\bullet(k)$. Then, for a smooth scheme $X$ we have the equivalence

$\text{Hom}_{H_\bullet(k)}(X_+, K(p,q,A)) = H^{p,q}(X,A)$

showing these sheaves represent motivic Eilenberg-Maclane spaces^{pg 3}.

== The stable homotopy category ==
A further construction in A^{1}-homotopy theory is the category SH(S), which is obtained from the above unstable category by forcing the smash product with G_{m} to become invertible. This process can be carried out either using model-categorical constructions using so-called G_{m}-spectra or alternatively using infinity-categories.

For S = Spec (R), the spectrum of the field of real numbers, there is a functor

$$SH(\mathbf R) \to SH$$

to the stable homotopy category from algebraic topology. The functor is characterized by sending a smooth scheme X / R to the real manifold associated to X. This functor has the property that it sends the map

$$\rho: S^0 \to \mathbf G_m, i.e., \{-1, 1\} \to Spec \mathbf R[x, x^{-1}]$$

to an equivalence, since $\mathbf R^\times$ is homotopy equivalent to a two-point set. Bachmann (2018) has shown that the resulting functor

$$SH(\mathbf R)[\rho^{-1}] \to SH$$

is an equivalence.
