= Tsit Yuen Lam =

Hong Kong-American mathematician

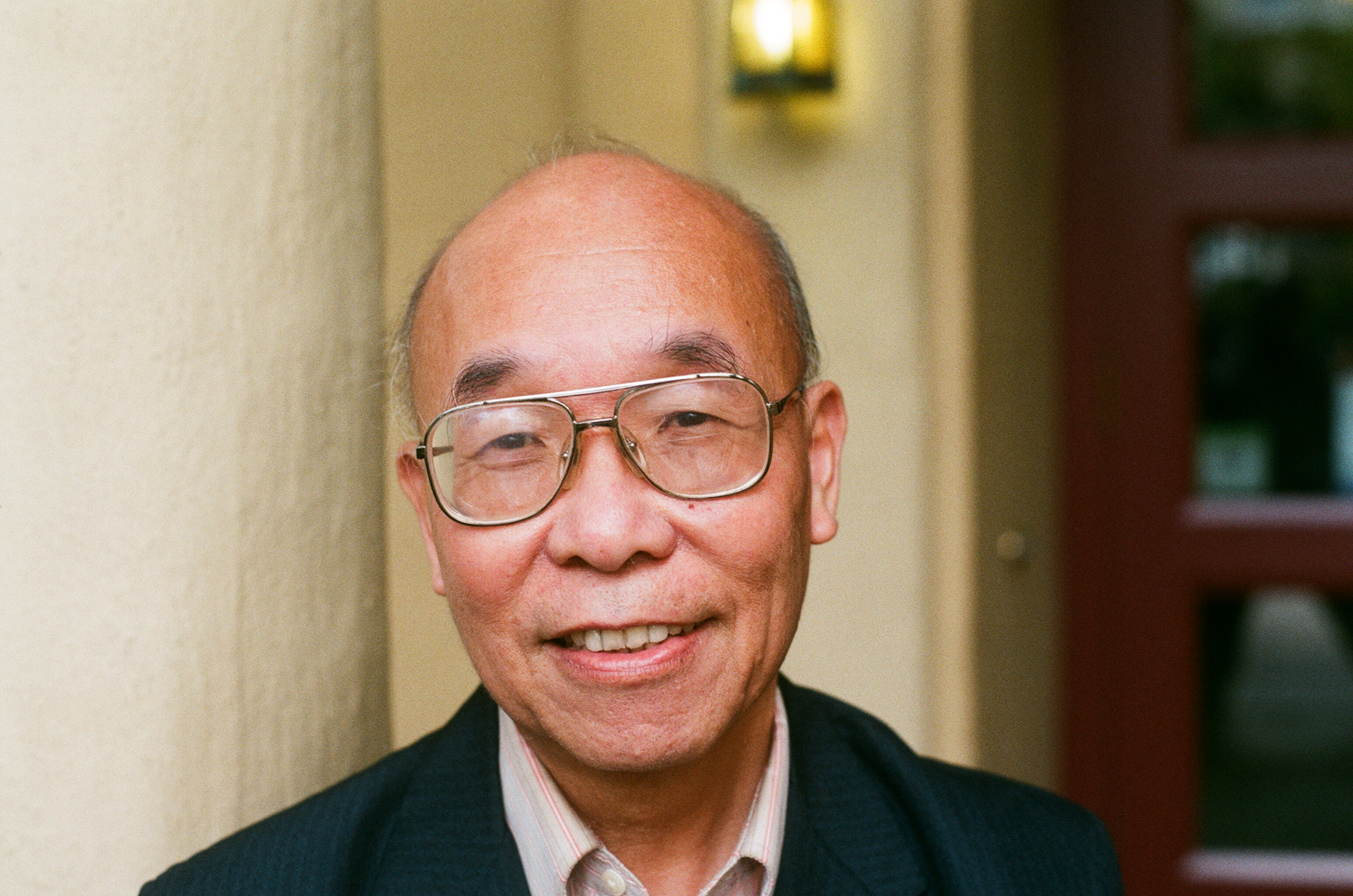
- Born: February 6, 1942 (age 83)

Tsit Yuen Lam (Chinese: 林節玄; Jyutping: lam4 zit3 jyun4; born 6 February 1942) is a Hong Kong-American mathematician specializing in algebra, especially ring theory and quadratic forms.

== Academic career ==
Lam earned his bachelor's degree at the University of Hong Kong in 1963 and his Ph.D. at Columbia University in 1967 under Hyman Bass, with a thesis titled On Grothendieck Groups. Subsequently, he was an instructor at the University of Chicago and since 1968 he has been at the University of California, Berkeley, where he became assistant professor in 1969, associate professor in 1972, and full professor in 1976. He served as assistant department head several times. From 1995 to 1997 he was Deputy Director of the Mathematical Sciences Research Institute in Berkeley, California.

Among his doctoral students is Richard Elman.

== Awards and honors ==
From 1972 to 1974 he was a Sloan Fellow; in 1978–79 a Miller Research Professor; and in 1981–82 a Guggenheim Fellow. In 1982 he was awarded the Leroy P. Steele Prize for his textbooks.

In 2012 he became a fellow of the American Mathematical Society.

== Selected publications ==
- Serre’s Conjecture. Lecture Notes in Mathematics, Springer, 1978
- Serre’s Problem on Projective Modules. Springer 2006; 2nd printing, 2010
- The Algebraic Theory of Quadratic Forms. Benjamin 1973, 1980; new version published as Introduction to Quadratic Forms over Fields, American Mathematical Society, 2005
- A First Course in Non-Commutative Rings. Graduate Texts in Mathematics, Springer 1991, 2nd edition 2001, ISBN 0-387-95325-6
- Lectures on Modules and Rings. Springer, Graduate Texts in Mathematics 1999, ISBN 978-0-387-98428-5
- Sums of squares of real polynomials. (with Man-Duen Choi & Bruce Reznick), Proceedings of Symposia in Pure Mathematics 58, 103–126, 1995
- Orderings, Valuations and Quadratic Forms. AMS 1983
- Exercises in Classical Ring Theory. Springer 1985
- Representations of Finite Groups: A Hundred Years. Part I, Part II. Notices of the AMS 1998. (pdf files)
