= V-topology =

In mathematics, especially in algebraic geometry, the v-topology (also known as the universally subtrusive topology) is a Grothendieck topology whose covers are characterized by lifting maps from valuation rings. This topology was introduced by Rydh (2010) and studied further by Bhatt & Scholze (2017), who introduced the name v-topology, where v stands for valuation.

== Definition ==
A universally subtrusive map is a map f: X → Y of quasi-compact, quasi-separated schemes such that for any map v: Spec (V) → Y, where V is a valuation ring, there is an extension (of valuation rings) $V \subset W$ and a map Spec W → X lifting v.

== Examples ==
Examples of v-covers include faithfully flat maps, proper surjective maps. In particular, any Zariski covering is a v-covering. Moreover, universal homeomorphisms, such as $X_{red} \to X$, the normalisation of the cusp, and the Frobenius in positive characteristic are v-coverings. In fact, the perfection $X_{perf} \to X$ of a scheme is a v-covering.

== Voevodsky's h topology ==
See h-topology, relation to the v-topology

== Arc topology ==
Bhatt & Mathew (2018) have introduced the arc-topology, which is similar in its definition, except that only valuation rings of rank ≤ 1 are considered in the definition. A variant of this topology, with an analogous relationship that the h-topology has with the cdh topology, called the cdarc-topology was later introduced by Elmanto, Hoyois, Iwasa and Kelly (2020).

Bhatt & Scholze (2019, §8) show that the Amitsur complex of an arc covering of perfect rings is an exact complex.

== See also ==
- List of topologies on the category of schemes
