= Journal of Pure and Applied Algebra =

- Discipline: Algebra
- Language: English
- Edited by: Eric Friedlander; Charles Weibel; Srikanth Iyengar; Aldo Conca

Publication details
- History: 1971-present
- Publisher: North-Holland
- Frequency: Monthly
- Impact factor: 0.720 (2017)

Standard abbreviations
- ISO 4: J. Pure Appl. Algebra

Indexing
- CODEN: JPAAA2
- ISSN: 0022-4049
- LCCN: 79612749
- OCLC no.: 1800179

Links
- Journal homepage; Online access

The Journal of Pure and Applied Algebra is a monthly peer-reviewed scientific journal covering that part of algebra likely to be of general mathematical interest: algebraic results with immediate applications, and the development of algebraic theories of sufficiently general relevance to allow for future applications.

Its founding editors-in-chief were Peter J. Freyd (University of Pennsylvania) and Alex Heller (City University of New York). The current managing editors are Srikanth Iyengar (University of Utah), Charles Weibel (Rutgers University), and Aldo Conca (Università di Genova).

== Abstracting and indexing ==
The journal is abstracted and indexed in Current Contents/Physics, Chemical, & Earth Sciences, Mathematical Reviews, PASCAL, Science Citation Index, Zentralblatt MATH, and Scopus. According to the Journal Citation Reports, the journal has a 2016 impact factor of 0.652.
