= Richard Elman (mathematician) =

American mathematician

Richard Steven Elman (born 21 March 1945) is an American mathematician at the University of California, Los Angeles, known for his work in algebra. He received his Ph.D. at the University of California, Berkeley in 1972, under the supervision of Tsit Yuen Lam.

He is a fellow of the American Mathematical Society. Among his collaborators are Nikita Karpenko and Alexander Merkurjev.

== Selected publications ==
- as editor with Murray M. Schacher and Veeravalli S. Varadarajan: Linear algebraic groups and their representations. Contemporary Mathematics (AMS). Vol. 153. Providence, Rhode Island: American Mathematical Society. 1993. ISBN 9780821851616.
- with Nikita Karpenko and Alexander Merkurjev: The algebraic and geometric theory of quadratic forms. Colloquium publications (AMS). Vol. 56. Providence, R. I.: American Mathematical Society. 2008. ISBN 9780821873229.
