= Susan Friedlander =

American mathematician

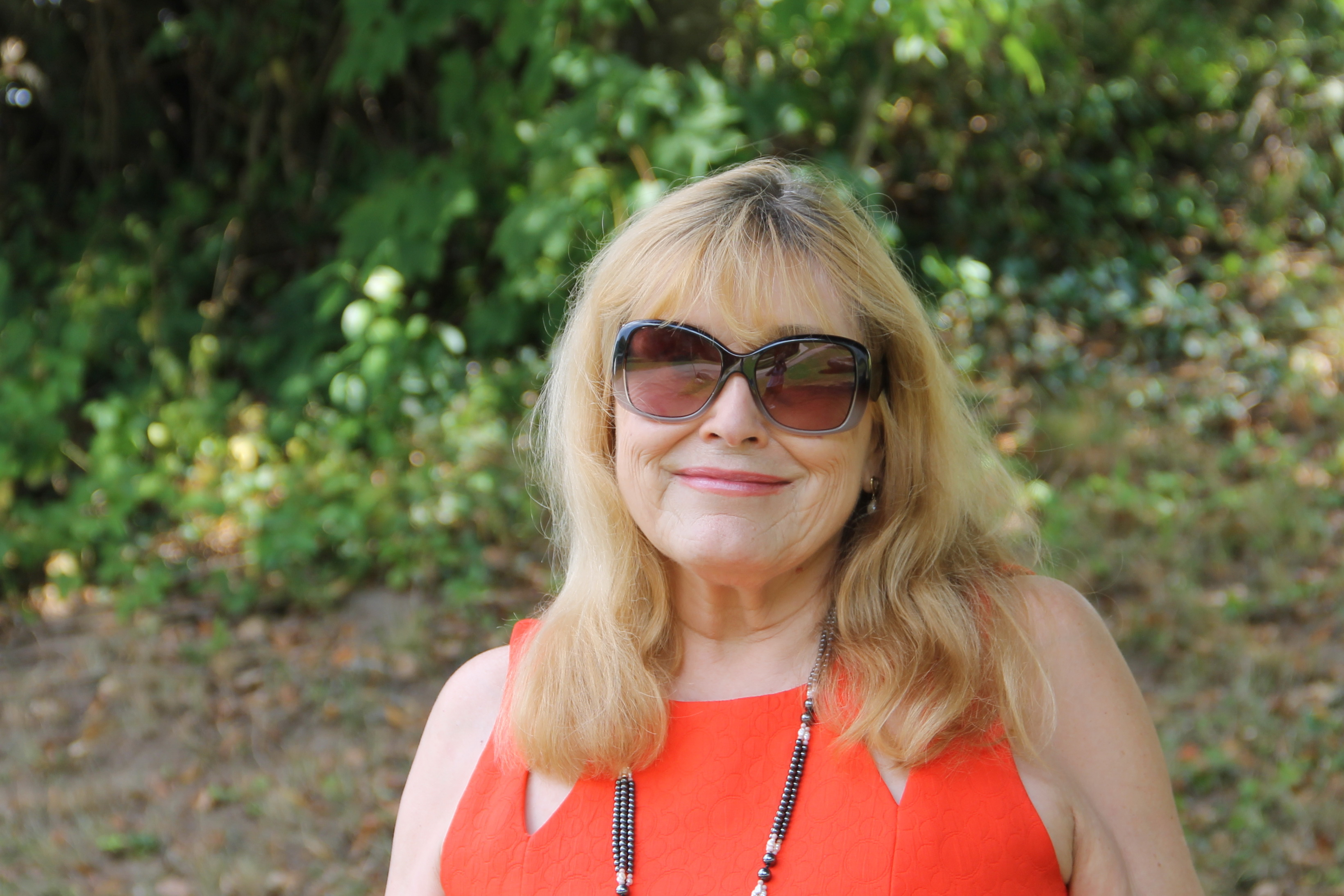
- Citizenship: American and British
- Education: University College London; Massachusetts Institute of Technology; Princeton University
- Known for: Mathematical Fluid Dynamics
- Awards: Kennedy Scholarship; Medal of the Institute Henri Poincaré
- Scientific career
- Workplaces: University of Southern California; University of Illinois, Chicago; Princeton University
- Website: www-bcf.usc.edu/~susanfri/

Susan Jean Friedlander (née Poate; born January 26, 1946) is an American mathematician. Her research concerns mathematical fluid dynamics, the Euler equations and the Navier-Stokes equations.

== Education ==
Friedlander graduated from University College, London with a BS in Mathematics in 1967. She was awarded a Kennedy Scholarship to study at MIT, where she earned an MS in 1970. She completed her doctorate in 1972 from Princeton University under the supervision of Louis Norberg Howard.

== Career ==
From 1972–1974, Friedlander was a Visiting Member at the Courant Institute of Mathematical Sciences, followed by a year as an instructor at Princeton University. In 1975, she joined the faculty in the Mathematics department at the University of Illinois at Chicago. In 2007, she moved to the University of Southern California where she is Professor of Mathematics and the Director of the Center for Applied Mathematical Sciences.

== Service ==
From 1996–2010, Friedlander served as an officer of the American Mathematical Society in the role of Associate Secretary. In 2005, she was appointed the first female Editor-in-Chief of the Bulletin of the American Mathematical Society. Her other leadership activities include membership of the Scientific Advisory Committee of the Mathematical Sciences Research Institute (2001–2006), the Board of Mathematical Sciences and their Applications (2008–2011), the Section A Steering Committee of the American Association for the Advancement of Science (2013–2015), and the MIT Mathematics Department Visiting Committee (2013–2021). She is currently the Chair of the Mathematical Council of the Americas.

== Honors and awards ==
- 1967–1969 Kennedy Scholarship, MIT
- 1993 N.S.F Visiting Professorship for Women, Brown University
- 1995 Elected Honorary Member, Moscow Mathematical Society
- 1998 Medal of the Institute Henri Poincaré
- 2003 Senior Scholar Award, University of Illinois at Chicago
- 2012 Fellow, Society for Industrial and Applied Mathematics
- 2012 Fellow, the American Association for the Advancement of Science
- 2012 Fellow, the American Mathematical Society

== Personal ==
Friedlander is married to mathematician Eric Friedlander.
