= Goro Azumaya =

Japanese mathematician

- Born: February 26, 1920; Yokohama, Japan
- Died: July 8, 2010 (aged 90); Matsudo, Japan
- Education: Nagoya University
- Known for: Azumaya algebra Krull–Azumaya theorem Henselian ring
- Scientific career
- Fields: Mathematics
- Workplaces: Indiana University
- Doctoral advisor: Shokichi Iyanaga

Gorō Azumaya (東屋 五郎, Azumaya Gorō; February 26, 1920– July 8, 2010) was a Japanese mathematician who introduced the notion of Azumaya algebra in 1951. His advisor was Shokichi Iyanaga. At the time of his death he was an emeritus professor at Indiana University.
