= Essential dimension =

In mathematics, essential dimension is an invariant defined for certain algebraic structures such as algebraic groups and quadratic forms. It was introduced by Joe Buhler and Zinovy Reichstein and in its full generality defined by Alexander Merkurjev.

Basically, essential dimension measures the complexity of algebraic structures via their fields of definition. For example, if $K$ is a field and $V$ a $K$-vector space, a quadratic form $q:V\to K$ is said to be defined over a subfield $L$ of $K$ if there exists a $K$-basis $e_1,\dots,e_n$ of $V$ such that $q$ can be expressed in the form

$$q\bigg(\sum_{i=1}^n x_i e_i\bigg) = \sum a_{ij} x_ix_j$$

with all coefficients $a_{ij}$ belonging to $L$. If $K$ has characteristic different from 2, every quadratic form is diagonalizable. Therefore, $q$ has a field of definition generated by $n$ elements. Technically, one always works over a (fixed) base field $k$ and the fields $K$ and $L$ in consideration are supposed to contain $k$. The essential dimension of $q$ is then defined as the least transcendence degree over $k$ of a subfield $L$ of $K$ over which $q$ is defined.

== Formal definition ==
Fix an arbitrary field $k$ and let Fields$/k$ denote the category of finitely generated field extensions of $k$ with inclusions as morphisms. Consider a (covariant) functor $F:$ Fields$/k\to$ Set. For a field extension $K/k$ and an element $a$ of $F(K/k)$ a field of definition of $a$ is an intermediate field $K/L/k$ such that $a$ is contained in the image of the map $F(L/k)\to F(K/k)$ induced by the inclusion of $L$ in $K$.

The essential dimension of $a$, denoted by $\operatorname{ed}(a)$, is the least transcendence degree (over $k$) of a field of definition for $a$. The essential dimension of the functor F, denoted by $\operatorname{ed}(F)$, is the supremum of $\operatorname{ed}(a)$ taken over all elements $a$ of $F(K/k)$ and objects $K/k$ of Fields$/k$.

== Examples ==
- Essential dimension of quadratic forms: For a natural number $n$ consider the functor $Q_n:$ Fields$/k\to$ Set taking a field extension $K/k$ to the set of isomorphism classes of non-degenerate $n$-dimensional quadratic forms over $K$ and taking a morphism $L/k\to K/k$ (given by the inclusion of $L$ in $K$) to the map sending the isomorphism class of a quadratic form $q:V\to L$ to the isomorphism class of the quadratic form $q_K : V \otimes_L K \to K$.
- Essential dimension of algebraic groups: for an algebraic group $G$ over $k$ denote by $H^1(-,G):$ Fields$/k\to$ Set the functor taking a field extension $K/k$ to the set of isomorphism classes of $G$-torsors over $K$ (in the fppf-topology). The essential dimension of this functor is called the essential dimension of the algebraic group $G$, denoted by $\operatorname{ed}(G)$.
- Essential dimension of a fibered category: let $\mathcal{F}$ be a category fibered over the category $\operatorname{Aff}/k$ of affine $k$-schemes, given by a functor $p : \mathcal{F} \to \operatorname{Aff}/k$. For example, $\mathcal{F}$ may be the moduli stack $\mathcal{M}_g$ of genus $g$ curves or the classifying stack $\mathcal{BG}$ of an algebraic group. Assume that for each $A\in\operatorname{Aff}/k$ the isomorphism classes of objects in the fiber $p^{-1}(A)$ form a set. Then we get a functor $F_p:$ Fields$/k\to$ Set taking a field extension $K/k$ to the set of isomorphism classes in the fiber $p^{-1}(\operatorname{Spec}(K))$. The essential dimension of the fibered category $\mathcal{F}$ is defined as the essential dimension of the corresponding functor $F_p$. In the case of the classifying stack $\mathcal{F} = \mathcal{BG}$ of an algebraic group $G$, the value coincides with the previously defined essential dimension of $G$.

== Known results ==
- The essential dimension of a linear algebraic group $G$ is always finite and bounded by the minimal dimension of a generically free representation minus the dimension of $G$.
- For $G$ a Spin group over an algebraically closed field $k$, the essential dimension is listed in OEIS: A280191.
- The essential dimension of a finite algebraic p-group over $k$ equals the minimal dimension of a faithful representation, provided that the base field $k$ contains a primitive $p$-th root of unity.
- The essential dimension of the symmetric group $S_n$ (viewed as an algebraic group over $k$) is known for $n\leq 5$ (for every base field $k$), for $n=6$ (for $k$ of characteristic not 2) and for $n=7$ (in characteristic 0).
- Let $T$ be an algebraic torus admitting a Galois splitting field $L/k$ of degree a power of a prime $p$. Then the essential dimension of $T$ equals the least rank of the kernel of a homomorphism of $\operatorname{Gal}(L/k)$-lattices $P\to X(T)$ with cokernel finite and of order coprime to $p$, where $P$ is a permutation lattice.
