= Joe P. Buhler =

American mathematician

Joe Peter Buhler (born 1950 in Vancouver, Washington) is an American mathematician known for his contributions to algebraic number theory, algebra and cryptography.

== Education and career ==
Buhler received his undergraduate degree from Reed College in 1972, and his Ph.D. from Harvard University in 1977 with thesis Icosahedral Galois Representations and thesis advisor John Tate. Buhler was a professor at Reed College in Portland, Oregon from 1980 until his retirement in 2005. From 2004 to 2017, he was director of the IDA Center for Communications Research in La Jolla, California.

In 1997, he introduced, with Zinovy Reichstein, the concept of essential dimension.

Buhler is involved in a project to numerically verify the Kummer–Vandiver conjecture of Harry Vandiver and Ernst Eduard Kummer concerning the class number of cyclotomic fields. Vandiver proved it with a desk calculator up to class number 600, Derrick Lehmer (in the late 1940s) to about 5000, and Buhler with colleagues (in 2001) to 12 million. He continues the project with David Harvey and others.

He was elected a Fellow of the American Mathematical Society in 2012.
