= Tensor product of quadratic forms =

In mathematics, the tensor product of quadratic forms is most easily understood when one views the quadratic forms as quadratic spaces. If R is a commutative ring where 2 is invertible, and if $(V_1, q_1)$ and $(V_2,q_2)$ are two quadratic spaces over R, then their tensor product $(V_1 \otimes V_2, q_1 \otimes q_2)$ is the quadratic space whose underlying R-module is the tensor product $V_1 \otimes V_2$ of R-modules and whose quadratic form is the quadratic form associated to the tensor product of the bilinear forms associated to $q_1$ and $q_2$.

In particular, the form $q_1 \otimes q_2$ satisfies

$$(q_1\otimes q_2)(v_1 \otimes v_2) = q_1(v_1) q_2(v_2) \quad \forall v_1 \in V_1,\ v_2 \in V_2$$

(which does uniquely characterize it however). It follows from this that if the quadratic forms are diagonalizable (which is always possible if 2 is invertible in R), i.e.,

$$q_1 \cong \langle a_1, ... , a_n \rangle$$
$$q_2 \cong \langle b_1, ... , b_m \rangle$$

then the tensor product has diagonalization

$$q_1 \otimes q_2 \cong \langle a_1b_1, a_1b_2, ... a_1b_m, a_2b_1, ... , a_2b_m , ... , a_nb_1, ... a_nb_m \rangle.$$
