= Fabien Morel =

French mathematician (born 1965)

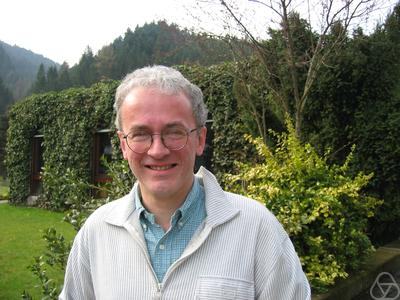
- Morel at Oberwolfach in 2005
- Born: 22 January 1965 (age 61); Reims, France
- Education: Paris Diderot University
- Occupation: Mathematician

Fabien Morel (born 22 January 1965) is a French algebraic geometer and key developer of A¹ homotopy theory with Vladimir Voevodsky. Among his accomplishments is the proof of the Friedlander conjecture, and the proof of the complex case of the Milnor conjecture stated in Milnor's 1983 paper 'On the homology of Lie groups made discrete'. This result was presented at the Second Abel Conference, held in January–February 2012.

In 2006, he was an invited speaker with a talk on A^{1}-algebraic topology at the International Congress of Mathematicians in Madrid.

== Selected publications ==
- A^{1}-algebraic topology over a field. (= Lecture Notes in Mathematics. 2052). Springer, 2012, ISBN 978-3-642-29513-3.
- with Marc Levine: Algebraic Cobordism. Springer, 2007, ISBN 978-3-540-36822-9.
- Homotopy theory of Schemes. American Mathematical Society, 2006 (French original published by Société Mathématique de France 1999)
