= Norm residue isomorphism theorem =

Theorem relating Milnor K-theory and Galois cohomology

In mathematics, the norm residue isomorphism theorem is a long-sought result relating Milnor K-theory and Galois cohomology. The result has a relatively elementary formulation and at the same time represents the key juncture in the proofs of many seemingly unrelated theorems from abstract algebra, theory of quadratic forms, algebraic K-theory and the theory of motives. The theorem asserts that a certain statement holds true for any prime $\ell$ and any natural number $n$. John Milnor speculated that this theorem might be true for $\ell=2$ and all $n$, and this question became known as Milnor's conjecture. The general case was conjectured by Spencer Bloch and Kazuya Kato and became known as the Bloch–Kato conjecture or the motivic Bloch–Kato conjecture to distinguish it from the Bloch–Kato conjecture on values of L-functions. The norm residue isomorphism theorem was proved by Vladimir Voevodsky using a number of highly innovative results of Markus Rost.

== Statement ==
For any integer ℓ invertible in a field $k$ there is a map $\partial : k^\times \rightarrow H^1(k, \mu_\ell)$ where $\mu_\ell$ denotes the Galois module of ℓ-th roots of unity in some separable closure of k. It induces an isomorphism $k^\times/(k^\times)^\ell \cong H^1(k, \mu_\ell)$. The first hint that this is related to K-theory is that $k^\times$ is the group K_{1}(k). Taking the tensor products and applying the multiplicativity of étale cohomology yields an extension of the map $\partial$ to maps:

$$\partial^n : k^\times \otimes \cdots \otimes k^\times \rightarrow H^n_{\rm\acute et}(k, \mu_\ell^{\otimes n}).$$

These maps have the property that, for every element a in $k \setminus \{0,1\}$, $\partial^n(\ldots,a,\ldots,1-a,\ldots)$ vanishes. This is the defining relation of Milnor K-theory. Specifically, Milnor K-theory is defined to be the graded parts of the ring:

$$K^M_*(k) = T(k^\times)/(\{a \otimes (1-a) \colon a \in k \setminus \{0, 1\}\}),$$

where $T(k^\times)$ is the tensor algebra of the multiplicative group $k^\times$ and the quotient is by the two-sided ideal generated by all elements of the form $a \otimes (1 - a)$. Therefore the map $\partial^n$ factors through a map:

$$\partial^n \colon K^M_n(k) \to H^n_{\rm\acute et}(k, \mu_\ell^{\otimes n}).$$

This map is called the Galois symbol or norm residue map. Because étale cohomology with mod-ℓ coefficients is an ℓ-torsion group, this map additionally factors through $K^M_n(k) / \ell$.

The norm residue isomorphism theorem (or Bloch–Kato conjecture) states that for a field k and an integer ℓ that is invertible in k, the norm residue map

$$\partial^n : K_n^M(k)/\ell \to H^n_{\rm\acute et}(k, \mu_\ell^{\otimes n})$$

from Milnor K-theory mod-ℓ to étale cohomology is an isomorphism. The case ℓ = 2 is the Milnor conjecture, and the case n = 2 is the Merkurjev–Suslin theorem.

== History ==
The étale cohomology of a field is identical to Galois cohomology, so the conjecture equates the ℓth cotorsion (the quotient by the subgroup of ℓ-divisible elements) of the Milnor K-group of a field k with the Galois cohomology of k with coefficients in the Galois module of ℓth roots of unity. The point of the conjecture is that there are properties that are easily seen for Milnor K-groups but not for Galois cohomology, and vice versa; the norm residue isomorphism theorem makes it possible to apply techniques applicable to the object on one side of the isomorphism to the object on the other side of the isomorphism.

The case when n is 0 is trivial, and the case when n = 1 follows easily from Hilbert's Theorem 90. The case n = 2 and ℓ = 2 was proved by (Merkurjev 1981). An important advance was the case n = 2 and ℓ arbitrary. This case was proved by (Merkurjev & Suslin 1982) and is known as the Merkurjev–Suslin theorem. Later, Merkurjev and Suslin, and independently, Rost, proved the case n = 3 and ℓ = 2 (Merkurjev & Suslin 1991) (Rost 1986).

The name "norm residue" originally referred to the Hilbert symbol $(a_1, a_2)$, which takes values in the Brauer group of k (when the field contains all ℓ-th roots of unity). Its usage here is in analogy with standard local class field theory and is expected to be part of an (as yet undeveloped) "higher" class field theory.

The norm residue isomorphism theorem implies the Quillen–Lichtenbaum conjecture.

=== History of the proof ===
Milnor's conjecture was proved by Vladimir Voevodsky. Later Voevodsky proved the general Bloch–Kato conjecture.

The starting point for the proof is a series of conjectures due to Lichtenbaum (1983) and Beilinson (1987). They conjectured the existence of motivic complexes, complexes of sheaves whose cohomology was related to motivic cohomology. Among the conjectural properties of these complexes were three properties: one connecting their Zariski cohomology to Milnor's K-theory, one connecting their etale cohomology to cohomology with coefficients in the sheaves of roots of unity and one connecting their Zariski cohomology to their etale cohomology. These three properties implied, as a very special case, that the norm residue map should be an isomorphism. The essential characteristic of the proof is that it uses the induction on the "weight" (which equals the dimension of the cohomology group in the conjecture) where the inductive step requires knowing not only the statement of Bloch-Kato conjecture but the much more general statement that contains a large part of the Beilinson-Lichtenbaum conjectures. It often occurs in proofs by induction that the statement being proved has to be strengthened in order to prove the inductive step. In this case the strengthening that was needed required the development of a very large amount of new mathematics.

The earliest proof of Milnor's conjecture is contained in a 1995 preprint of Voevodsky and is inspired by the idea that there should be algebraic analogs of Morava K-theory (these algebraic Morava K-theories were later constructed by Simone Borghesi). In a 1996 preprint, Voevodsky was able to remove Morava K-theory from the picture by introducing instead algebraic cobordisms and using some of their properties that were not proved at that time (these properties were proved later). The constructions of 1995 and 1996 preprints are now known to be correct but the first completed proof of Milnor's conjecture used a somewhat different scheme.

It is also the scheme that the proof of the full Bloch–Kato conjecture follows. It was devised by Voevodsky a few months after the 1996 preprint appeared. Implementing this scheme required making substantial advances in the field of motivic homotopy theory as well as finding a way to build algebraic varieties with a specified list of properties. From the motivic homotopy theory the proof required the following:

1. A construction of the motivic analog of the basic ingredient of the Spanier–Whitehead duality in the form of the motivic fundamental class as a morphism from the motivic sphere to the Thom space of the motivic normal bundle over a smooth projective algebraic variety.
2. A construction of the motivic analog of the Steenrod algebra.
3. A proof of the proposition stating that over a field of characteristic zero the motivic Steenrod algebra characterizes all bi-stable cohomology operations in the motivic cohomology.

The first two constructions were developed by Voevodsky by 2003. Combined with the results that had been known since late 1980s, they were sufficient to reprove the Milnor conjecture.

Also in 2003, Voevodsky published on the web a preprint that nearly contained a proof of the general theorem. It followed the original scheme but was missing the proofs of three statements. Two of these statements were related to the properties of the motivic Steenrod operations and required the third fact above, while the third one required then-unknown facts about "norm varieties". The properties that these varieties were required to have had been formulated by Voevodsky in 1997, and the varieties themselves had been constructed by Markus Rost in 1998–2003. The proof that they have the required properties was completed by Andrei Suslin and Seva Joukhovitski in 2006.

The third fact above required the development of new techniques in motivic homotopy theory. The goal was to prove that a functor, which was not assumed to commute with limits or colimits, preserved weak equivalences between objects of a certain form. One of the main difficulties there was that the standard approach to the study of weak equivalences is based on Bousfield–Quillen factorization systems and model category structures, and these were inadequate. Other methods had to be developed, and this work was completed by Voevodsky only in 2008.

In the course of developing these techniques, it became clear that the first statement used without proof in Voevodsky's 2003 preprint is false. The proof had to be modified slightly to accommodate the corrected form of that statement. While Voevodsky continued to work out the final details of the proofs of the main theorems about motivic Eilenberg–MacLane spaces, Charles Weibel invented an approach to correct the place in the proof that had to modified. Weibel also published in 2009 a paper that contained a summary of Voevodsky's constructions combined with the correction that he discovered.

== Beilinson–Lichtenbaum conjecture ==
Let X be a smooth variety over a field containing $1/\ell$. Beilinson and Lichtenbaum conjectured that the motivic cohomology group $H^{p,q}(X, \mathbf{Z}/\ell)$ is isomorphic to the étale cohomology group $H^p_{\rm\acute et}(X, \mu^{\otimes q}_\ell)$ when p≤q. This conjecture has now been proven, and is equivalent to the norm residue isomorphism theorem.

== Bibliography ==
- Bloch, Spencer; Kato, Kazuya (1986). "p-adic etale cohomology". Publications Mathématiques de l'IHÉS. 63: 107–152. doi:10.1007/bf02831624.
- Borghesi, Simone (2000), Algebraic Morava K-theories and the higher degree formula, Preprint
- Efrat, Ido (2006). Valuations, orderings, and Milnor K-theory. Mathematical Surveys and Monographs. Vol. 124. Providence, RI: American Mathematical Society. ISBN 0-8218-4041-X. Zbl 1103.12002.
- Gille, Philippe; Szamuely, Tamás (2006). Central simple algebras and Galois cohomology. Cambridge Studies in Advanced Mathematics. Vol. 101. Cambridge: Cambridge University Press. ISBN 0-521-86103-9. Zbl 1137.12001.
- Milnor, John (1970). "Algebraic K-theory and quadratic forms". Inventiones Mathematicae. 9 (4): 318–344. Bibcode:1970InMat...9..318M. doi:10.1007/bf01425486.
- Rost, Markus (1998). "Chain lemma for splitting fields of symbols".
- Srinivas, V. (2008). Algebraic K-theory. Modern Birkhäuser Classics (Paperback reprint of the 1996 2nd ed.). Boston, MA: Birkhäuser. ISBN 978-0-8176-4736-0. Zbl 1125.19300.
- Voevodsky, Vladimir (1995), Bloch-Kato conjecture for Z/2-coefficients and algebraic Morava K-theories, Preprint, CiteSeerX 10.1.1.154.922
- Voevodsky, Vladimir (1996), The Milnor Conjecture, Preprint
- Voevodsky, Vladimir (2001), On 2-torsion in motivic cohomology, Preprint, arXiv:math/0107110, Bibcode:2001math......7110V
- Voevodsky, Vladimir (2003a), "Reduced power operations in motivic cohomology", Institut des Hautes Études Scientifiques. Publications Mathématiques, 98 (1): 1–57, arXiv:math/0107109, doi:10.1007/s10240-003-0009-z, ISSN 0073-8301, MR 2031198
- Voevodsky, Vladimir (2003b), "Motivic cohomology with Z/2-coefficients", Institut des Hautes Études Scientifiques. Publications Mathématiques, 98 (1): 59–104, doi:10.1007/s10240-003-0010-6, ISSN 0073-8301, MR 2031199
- Voevodsky, Vladimir (2008). "On motivic cohomology with Z/L coefficients". arXiv:0805.4430 [math.AG].
- Weibel, Charles (2009). "The norm residue isomorphism theorem". Journal of Topology. 2 (2): 346–372. doi:10.1112/jtopol/jtp013. MR 2529300.
- Voevodsky, Vladimir (2011). "On motivic cohomology with Z/L-coefficients". Annals of Mathematics. 174 (1): 401–438. arXiv:0805.4430. doi:10.4007/annals.2011.174.1.11.
