= Nisnevich topology =

Structure in algebraic geometry

In algebraic geometry, the Nisnevich topology, sometimes called the completely decomposed topology, is a Grothendieck topology on the category of schemes which has been used in algebraic K-theory, A¹ homotopy theory, and the theory of motives. It was originally introduced by Yevsey Nisnevich, who was motivated by the theory of adeles.

== Definition ==
A morphism of schemes $f:Y \to X$ is called a Nisnevich morphism if it is an étale morphism such that for every (possibly non-closed) point x ∈ X, there exists a point y ∈ Y in the fiber f^{−1}(x) such that the induced map of residue fields k(x) → k(y) is an isomorphism. Equivalently, f must be flat, unramified, locally of finite presentation, and for every point x ∈ X, there must exist a point y in the fiber f^{−1}(x) such that k(x) → k(y) is an isomorphism.

A family of morphisms {u_{α} : X_{α} → X} is a Nisnevich cover if each morphism in the family is étale and for every (possibly non-closed) point x ∈ X, there exists α and a point y ∈ X_{α} s.t. u_{α}(y) = x and the induced map of residue fields k(x) → k(y) is an isomorphism. If the family is finite, this is equivalent to the morphism $\coprod u_\alpha$ from $\coprod X_\alpha$ to X being a Nisnevich morphism. The Nisnevich covers are the covering families of a pretopology on the category of schemes and morphisms of schemes. This generates a topology called the Nisnevich topology. The category of schemes with the Nisnevich topology is notated Nis.

The small Nisnevich site of X has as underlying category the same as the small étale site, that is to say, objects are schemes U with a fixed étale morphism U → X and the morphisms are morphisms of schemes compatible with the fixed maps to X. Admissible coverings are Nisnevich morphisms.

The big Nisnevich site of X has as underlying category schemes with a fixed map to X and morphisms the morphisms of X-schemes. The topology is the one given by Nisnevich morphisms.

The Nisnevich topology has several variants which are adapted to studying singular varieties. Covers in these topologies include resolutions of singularities or weaker forms of resolution.

- The cdh topology allows proper birational morphisms as coverings.
- The h topology allows De Jong's alterations as coverings.
- The l′ topology allows morphisms as in the conclusion of Gabber's local uniformization theorem.

The cdh and l′ topologies are incomparable with the étale topology, and the h topology is finer than the étale topology.

=== Equivalent conditions for a Nisnevich cover ===
Assume the category consists of smooth schemes over a qcqs (quasi-compact and quasi-separated) scheme, then the original definition due to Nisnevich^{Remark 3.39}, which is equivalent to the definition above, for a family of morphisms $\{p_\alpha: U_\alpha \to X\}_{\alpha \in A}$ of schemes to be a Nisnevich covering is if

1. Every $p_\alpha$ is étale; and
2. For all field $k$, on the level of $k$-points, the (set-theoretic) coproduct $p_k: \coprod_{\alpha}U_\alpha(k) \to X(k)$ of all covering morphisms $p_\alpha$ is surjective.

The following yet another equivalent condition for Nisnevich covers is due to Lurie: The Nisnevich topology is generated by all finite families of étale morphisms $\{p_\alpha: U_\alpha \to X\}_{\alpha \in A}$ such that there is a finite sequence of finitely presented closed subschemes

$\varnothing = Z_{n+1} \subseteq Z_n \subseteq \cdots \subseteq Z_1 \subseteq Z_0 = X$

such that for $0\leq m\leq n$,

$\coprod_{\alpha \in A} p_\alpha^{-1}(Z_m - Z_{m+1}) \to Z_m - Z_{m+1}$

admits a section.

Notice that when evaluating these morphisms on $S$-points, this implies the map is a surjection. Conversely, taking the trivial sequence $Z_0 = X$ gives the result in the opposite direction.

== Motivation ==
One of the key motivations for introducing the Nisnevich topology in motivic cohomology is the fact that a Zariski open cover $\pi: U \to X$ does not yield a resolution of Zariski sheaves

$\cdots \to \mathbf{Z}_{tr}(U\times_XU) \to \mathbf{Z}_{tr}(U) \to \mathbf{Z}_{tr}(X) \to 0$

where

$\mathbf{Z}_{tr}(Y)(Z) := \text{Hom}_{cor}(Z,Y)$

is the representable functor over the category of presheaves with transfers. For the Nisnevich topology, the local rings are Henselian, and a finite cover of a Henselian ring is given by a product of Henselian rings, showing exactness.

== Local rings in the Nisnevich topology ==
If x is a point of a scheme X, then the local ring of x in the Nisnevich topology is the Henselization of the local ring of x in the Zariski topology. This differs from the Etale topology where the local rings are strict henselizations. One of the important points between the two cases can be seen when looking at a local ring $(R,\mathfrak{p})$ with residue field $\kappa$. In this case, the residue fields of the Henselization and strict Henselization differ

$$\begin{align}
(R,\mathfrak{p})^h &\rightsquigarrow \kappa \\
(R,\mathfrak{p})^{sh} &\rightsquigarrow \kappa^{sep}
\end{align}$$

so the residue field of the strict Henselization gives the separable closure of the original residue field $\kappa$.

== Examples of Nisnevich Covering ==
Consider the étale cover given by

$$\text{Spec}(\mathbb{C}[x,t,t^{-1}]/(x^2 - t)) \to \text{Spec}(\mathbb{C}[t,t^{-1}])$$

If we look at the associated morphism of residue fields for the generic point of the base, we see that this is a degree 2 extension

$$\mathbb{C}(t) \to \frac{\mathbb{C}(t)[x]}{(x^2 - t)}$$

This implies that this étale cover is not Nisnevich. We can add the étale morphism $\mathbb{A}^1 - \{0,1\} \to \mathbb{A}^1 - \{0\}$ to get a Nisnevich cover since there is an isomorphism of points for the generic point of $\mathbb{A}^1-\{0\}$.

=== Conditional covering ===
If we take $\mathbb{A}^1$ as a scheme over a field $k$, then a covering^{pg 21} given by

$$\begin{align}
i: \mathbb{A}^1 - \{a \} \hookrightarrow \mathbb{A}^1 \\
f: \mathbb{A}^1 - \{0 \} \to \mathbb{A}^1
\end{align}$$

where $i$ is the inclusion and $f(x) = x^k$, then this covering is Nisnevich if and only if $x^k = a$ has a solution over $k$. Otherwise, the covering cannot be a surjection on $k$-points. In this case, the covering is only an Etale covering.

=== Zariski coverings ===
Every Zariski covering^{pg 21} is Nisnevich but the converse doesn't hold in general. This can be easily proven using any of the definitions since the residue fields will always be an isomorphism regardless of the Zariski cover, and by definition a Zariski cover will give a surjection on points. In addition, Zariski inclusions are always Etale morphisms.

== Applications ==
Nisnevich introduced his topology to provide a cohomological interpretation of the class set of an affine group scheme, which was originally defined in adelic terms. He used it to partially prove a conjecture of Alexander Grothendieck and Jean-Pierre Serre which states that a rationally trivial torsor under a reductive group scheme over an integral regular Noetherian base scheme is locally trivial in the Zariski topology. One of the key properties of the Nisnevich topology is the existence of a descent spectral sequence. Let X be a Noetherian scheme of finite Krull dimension, and let G_{n}(X) be the Quillen K-groups of the category of coherent sheaves on X. If $\tilde G_n^{\,\text{cd}}(X)$ is the sheafification of these groups with respect to the Nisnevich topology, there is a convergent spectral sequence

$$E^{p,q}_2 = H^p(X_\text{cd}, \tilde G_q^{\,\text{cd}}) \Rightarrow G_{q-p}(X)$$

for p ≥ 0, q ≥ 0, and p - q ≥ 0. If $\ell$ is a prime number not equal to the characteristic of X, then there is an analogous convergent spectral sequence for K-groups with coefficients in $\mathbf{Z}/\ell\mathbf{Z}$.

The Nisnevich topology has also found important applications in algebraic K-theory, A¹ homotopy theory and the theory of motives.

== See also ==
- Presheaf with transfers
- Mixed motives (math)
- A¹ homotopy theory
- Henselian ring
