= H topology =

In algebraic geometry, the h topology is a Grothendieck topology introduced by Vladimir Voevodsky to study the homology of schemes. It combines several good properties possessed by its related "sub"topologies, such as the qfh and cdh topologies. It has subsequently been used by Beilinson to study p-adic Hodge theory, in Bhatt and Scholze's work on projectivity of the affine Grassmannian, Huber and Jörder's study of differential forms, etc.

== Definition ==
Voevodsky defined the h topology to be the topology associated to finite families $\{p_i: U_{i} \to X\}$ of morphisms of finite type such that $\amalg U_i \to X$ is a universal topological epimorphism (i.e., a set of points in the target is an open subset if and only if its preimage is open, and any base change also has this property). Voevodsky worked with this topology exclusively on categories $Sch^{ft}_{/S}$ of schemes of finite type over a Noetherian base scheme S.

Bhatt-Scholze define the h topology on the category $Sch^{fp}_{/S}$ of schemes of finite presentation over a qcqs base scheme $S$ to be generated by $v$-covers of finite presentation. They show (generalising results of Voevodsky) that the h topology is generated by:

1. fppf-coverings, and
2. families of the form $\{X' \to X, Z \to X\}$ where
  1. $X' \to X$ is a proper morphism of finite presentation,
  2. $Z \to X$ is a closed immersion of finite presentation, and
  3. $X' \to X$ is an isomorphism over $X \setminus Z$.

Note that $X' = \varnothing$ is allowed in an abstract blowup, in which case Z is a nilimmersion of finite presentation.

== Examples ==
The h-topology is not subcanonical, so representable presheaves are almost never h-sheaves. However, the h-sheafification of representable sheaves are interesting and useful objects; while presheaves of relative cycles are not representable, their associated h-sheaves are representable in the sense that there exists a disjoint union of quasi-projective schemes whose h-sheafifications agree with these h-sheaves of relative cycles.

Any h-sheaf in positive characteristic satisfies $F(X) = F(X^{perf})$ where we interpret $X^{perf}$ as the colimit $\operatorname{colim} (F(X) \stackrel{\text{Frob}}{\to} F(X) \stackrel{\text{Frob}}{\to} \dots)$ over the Frobenii (if the Frobenius is of finite presentation, and if not, use an analogous colimit consisting of morphisms of finite presentation). In fact, (in positive characteristic) the h-sheafification $\mathcal{O}_h$ of the structure sheaf $\mathcal{O}$ is given by $\mathcal{O}_h(X) = \mathcal{O}(X^{perf})$. So the structure sheaf "is an h-sheaf on the category of perfect schemes" (although this sentence doesn't really make sense mathematically since morphisms between perfect schemes are almost never of finite presentation). In characteristic zero similar results hold with perfection replaced by semi-normalisation.

Huber-Jörder study the h-sheafification $\Omega_h^n$ of the presheaf $X \mapsto \Gamma(X, \Omega^n_{X/k})$ of Kähler differentials on categories of schemes of finite type over a characteristic zero base field $k$. They show that if X is smooth, then $\Omega_h^n(X) = \Gamma(X, \Omega_{X/k}^n)$, and for various nice non-smooth X, the sheaf $\Omega_h^n$ recovers objects such as reflexive differentials and torsion-free differentials. Since the Frobenius is an h-covering, in positive characteristic we get $\Omega_h^n = 0$ for $n > 0$, but analogous results are true if we replace the h-topology with the cdh-topology.

By the Nullstellensatz, a morphism of finite presentation $X \to \operatorname{Spec}(k)$ towards the spectrum of a field $k$ admits a section up to finite extension. That is, there exists a finite field extension $L/k$ and a factorisation $\operatorname{Spec}(L) \to X \to \operatorname{Spec}(k)$. Consequently, for any presheaf $F$ and field $k$ we have $F_h(k) = F_{et}(k^{perf})$ where $F_h$, resp. $F_{et}$, denotes the h-sheafification, resp. etale sheafification.

== Properties ==
As mentioned above, in positive characteristic, any h-sheaf satisfies $F(X) = F(X^{perf})$. In characteristic zero, we have $F(X) = F(X^{sn})$ where $X^{sn}$ is the semi-normalisation (the scheme with the same underlying topological space, but the structure sheaf is replaced with its termwise seminormalisation).

Since the h-topology is finer than the Zariski topology, every scheme admits an h-covering by affine schemes.

Using abstract blowups and Noetherian induction, if $k$ is a field admitting resolution of singularities (e.g., a characteristic zero field) then any scheme of finite type over $k$ admits an h-covering by smooth $k$-schemes. More generally, in any situation where de Jong's theorem on alterations is valid we can find h-coverings by regular schemes.

Since finite morphisms are h-coverings, algebraic correspondences are finite sums of morphisms.

== cdh topology ==
The cdh topology on the category $Sch^{fp}_{/S}$ of schemes of finite presentation over a qcqs base scheme $S$ is generated by:

1. Nisnevich coverings, and
2. families of the form $\{X' \to X, Z \to X\}$ where
  1. $X' \to X$ is a proper morphism of finite presentation,
  2. $Z \to X$ is a closed immersion of finite presentation, and
  3. $X' \to X$ is an isomorphism over $X \setminus Z$.

It is the universal topology with a "good" theory of compact supports.

The cd stands for completely decomposed (in the same sense it is used for the Nisnevich topology). As mentioned in the examples section, over a field admitting resolution of singularities, any variety admits a cdh-covering by smooth varieties. This topology is heavily used in the study of Voevodsky motives with integral coefficients (with rational coefficients the h-topology together with de Jong alterations is used).

Since the Frobenius is not a cdh-covering, the cdh-topology is also a useful replacement for the h-topology in the study of differentials in positive characteristic.

Rather confusingly, there are completely decomposed h-coverings, which are not cdh-coverings, for example the completely decomposed family of flat morphisms $\{\mathbb{A}^1 \stackrel{x \mapsto x^2}{\to} \mathbb{A}^1, \mathbb{A}^1 \setminus \{0\} \stackrel{x \mapsto x}{\to} \mathbb{A}^1\}$.

== Relation to v-topology and arc-topology ==
The v-topology (or universally subtrusive topology) is equivalent to the h-topology on the category $Sch^{ft}_S$ of schemes of finite type over a Noetherian base scheme S. Indeed, a morphism in $Sch^{ft}_S$ is universally subtrusive if and only if it is universally submersive Rydh (2010, Cor.2.10). In other words,

$$Shv_h(Sch^{ft}_S) = Shv_v(Sch^{ft}_S), \qquad (S\ \textrm{Noetherian})$$

More generally, on the category $Sch$ of all qcqs schemes, neither of the v- nor the h- topologies are finer than the other: $Shv_h(Sch) \not\subset Shv_v(Sch)$ and $Shv_v(Sch) \not\subset Shv_h(Sch)$. There are v-covers which are not h-covers (e.g., $Spec(\mathbb{C}(x)) \to Spec(\mathbb{C})$) and h-covers which are not v-covers (e.g., $Spec (R / \mathfrak{p}) \sqcup Spec(R_\mathfrak{p}) \to Spec(R)$ where R is a valuation ring of rank 2 and $\mathfrak{p}$ is the non-open, non-closed prime Rydh (2010, Example 4.3)).

However, we could define an h-analogue of the fpqc topology by saying that an hqc-covering is a family $\{T_i \to T\}_{i \in I}$ such that for each affine open $U \subseteq T$ there exists a finite set K, a map $i: K \to I$ and affine opens $U_{i(k)} \subseteq T_{i(k)} \times_T U$ such that $\sqcup_{k \in K} U_{i(k)} \to U$ is universally submersive (with no finiteness conditions). Then every v-covering is an hqc-covering.

$$Shv_{hqc}(Sch) \subsetneq Shv_v(Sch).$$

Indeed, any subtrusive morphism is submersive (this is an easy exercise using Rydh (2010, Cor.1.5 and Def.2.2)).

By a theorem of Rydh, for a map $f: Y \to X$ of qcqs schemes with $X$ Noetherian, $f$ is a v-cover if and only if it is an arc-cover (for the statement in this form see Bhatt & Mathew (2018, Prop.2.6)). That is, in the Noetherian setting everything said above for the v-topology is valid for the arc-topology.
