= Zinovy Reichstein =

Russian-born Jewish-American mathematician (born 1961)

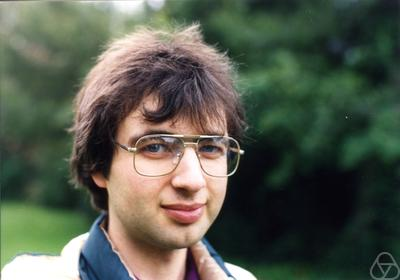
- Born: 1961 (age 64–65)
- Education: Harvard University; California Institute of Technology; Institute for Railroad Engineers
- Known for: Essential dimension
- Scientific career
- Fields: Mathematics
- Workplaces: University of British Columbia; Oregon State University; University of California, Berkeley; University of Pennsylvania
- Doctoral advisor: Michael Artin

Zinovy B. Reichstein (born 1961) is a Russian-born American mathematician. He is a professor at the University of British Columbia in Vancouver. He studies mainly algebra, algebraic geometry and algebraic groups. He introduced (with Joe P. Buhler) the concept of essential dimension.

== Early life and education ==
In high school, Reichstein participated in the national mathematics olympiad in Russia and was the third highest scorer in 1977 and second highest scorer in 1978.

Because of the Antisemitism in the Soviet Union at the time, Reichstein was not accepted to Moscow University, even though he had passed the special math entrance exams. He attended a semester of college at Russian University of Transport instead.

His family then decided to emigrate, arriving in Vienna, Austria, in August 1979 and New York, United States in the fall of 1980. Reichstein worked as a delivery boy for a short period of time in New York. He was then accepted to and attended California Institute of Technology for his undergraduate studies.

Reichstein received his PhD degree in 1988 from Harvard University under the supervision of Michael Artin. Parts of his thesis entitled "The Behavior of Stability under Equivariant Maps" were published in the journal Inventiones Mathematicae.

== Career ==
As of 2011, Reichstein is on the editorial board of the mathematics journal Transformation groups.

After graduating from Harvard, Reichstein joined the University of Pennsylvania. In 1992, he began working at the University of California, Berkeley. The following year, he moved to Oregon State University. In 2001, Reichstein accepted a position at the University of British Columbia.

== Awards and honors ==
- Winner of the 2013 Jeffery-Williams Prize awarded by the Canadian Mathematical Society
- Fellow of the American Mathematical Society, 2012
- Invited Speaker to the International Congress of Mathematicians (Hyderabad, India 2010)
- The Algebraic Groups and Algebraic Geometry conference was held in 2021 in honor of his 60th birthday.
- Putnam Individual, Honorable Mention 1980
- Putnam Team (Honorable Mention) 1981
- Putnam Team (3rd Place) 1982

== Selected publications ==
- Buhler, J.; Reichstein, Z. (1997). "[No title found]". Compositio Mathematica. 106 (2): 159–179. doi:10.1023/a:1000144403695. ISSN 0010-437X.
- Reichstein, Zinovy; Youssin, Boris (2000-10-01). "Essential Dimensions of Algebraic Groups and a Resolution Theorem for G-Varieties". Canadian Journal of Mathematics. 52 (5): 1018–1056. arXiv:math/9903162. doi:10.4153/CJM-2000-043-5. ISSN 0008-414X.
- Reichstein, Z. (2000). "On the notion of essential dimension for algebraic groups". Transformation Groups. 5 (3): 265–304. doi:10.1007/BF01679716. ISSN 1083-4362.
- Reichstein, Zinovy (November 2012). "? W H A T I S . . . Essential Dimension?" (PDF). Notices of the AMS. 59 (10): 1433–1434.
- Brosnan, Patrick; Reichstein, Zinovy; Vistoli, Angelo (2010). "Essential dimension, spinor groups, and quadratic forms". Annals of Mathematics. 171 (1): 533–544. arXiv:0907.0922. doi:10.4007/annals.2010.171.533. ISSN 0003-486X. JSTOR 27799209.
- Lemire, Nicole; Popov, Vladimir; Reichstein, Zinovy (2006-02-06). "Cayley groups". Journal of the American Mathematical Society. 19 (4): 921–967. arXiv:math/0409004. doi:10.1090/S0894-0347-06-00522-4. ISSN 0894-0347.
- Chernousov, V.; Gille, P.; Reichstein, Z. (2006). "Resolving G -torsors by abelian base extensions". Journal of Algebra. 296 (2): 561–581. arXiv:math/0404392. doi:10.1016/j.jalgebra.2005.02.026.
