= Motivic cohomology =

Invariant of algebraic varieties and of more general schemes

In algebraic geometry, motivic cohomology is an invariant of algebraic varieties and of more general schemes. It is a type of cohomology related to motives and includes the Chow ring of algebraic cycles as a special case. Some of the deepest problems in algebraic geometry and number theory are attempts to understand motivic cohomology.

== Motivic homology and cohomology ==
Let X be a scheme of finite type over a field k. A key goal of algebraic geometry is to compute the Chow groups of X, because they give strong information about all subvarieties of X. The Chow groups of X have some of the formal properties of Borel–Moore homology in topology, but some things are missing. For example, for a closed subscheme Z of X, there is an exact sequence of Chow groups, the localization sequence

$$CH_i(Z) \to CH_i(X) \to CH_i(X-Z) \to 0,$$

whereas in topology this would be part of a long exact sequence.

This problem was resolved by generalizing Chow groups to a bigraded family of groups, (Borel–Moore) motivic homology groups (which were first called higher Chow groups by Bloch). Namely, for every scheme X of finite type over a field k and integers i and j, we have an abelian group $H_{i}(X,\Z(j))$, with the usual Chow group being the special case

$$CH_i(X) \cong H_{2i}(X,\Z(i)).$$

For a closed subscheme Z of a scheme X, there is a long exact localization sequence for motivic homology groups, ending with the localization sequence for Chow groups:

$$\cdots\to H_{2i+1}(X-Z,\Z(i))\to H_{2i}(Z,\Z(i))\to H_{2i}(X,\Z(i))\to H_{2i}(X-Z,\Z(i))\to 0.$$

In fact, this is one of a family of four theories constructed by Voevodsky: motivic cohomology, motivic cohomology with compact support, Borel-Moore motivic homology (as above), and motivic homology with compact support. These theories have many of the formal properties of the corresponding theories in topology. For example, the motivic cohomology groups $H^{i}(X,\Z(j))$ form a bigraded ring for every scheme X of finite type over a field. When X is smooth of dimension n over k, there is a Poincaré duality isomorphism

$$H^i(X,\Z(j))\cong H_{2n-i}(X,\Z(n-j)).$$

In particular, the Chow group CH^{i}(X) of codimension-i cycles is isomorphic to $H^{2i}(X,\Z(i))$ when X is smooth over k.

The motivic cohomology $H^{i}(X,\Z(j))$ of a smooth scheme X over k is the cohomology of X in the Zariski topology with coefficients in a certain complex of sheaves Z(j) on X (some properties are easier to prove using the Nisnevich topology, but this gives the same motivic cohomology groups). For example, Z(j) is zero for j < 0, Z(0) is the constant sheaf Z, and Z(1) is isomorphic in the derived category of X to G_{m}[−1]. Here G_{m} (the multiplicative group) denotes the sheaf of invertible regular functions, and the shift [−1] means that this sheaf is viewed as a complex in degree 1.

The four versions of motivic homology and cohomology can be defined with coefficients in any abelian group. The theories with different coefficients are related by the universal coefficient theorem, as in topology.

== Relations to other cohomology theories ==
=== Relation to K-theory ===
By Bloch, Lichtenbaum, Friedlander, Suslin, and Levine, there is a spectral sequence from motivic cohomology to algebraic K-theory for every smooth scheme X over a field, analogous to the Atiyah-Hirzebruch spectral sequence in topology:

$$E_2^{pq}=H^p(X,\Z(-q/2)) \implies K_{-p-q}(X).$$

As in topology, the spectral sequence degenerates after tensoring with the rationals. For arbitrary schemes of finite type over a field (not necessarily smooth), there is an analogous spectral sequence from motivic homology to G-theory (the K-theory of coherent sheaves, rather than vector bundles).

=== Relation to Milnor K-theory ===
Motivic cohomology provides a rich invariant already for fields. (Note that a field k determines a scheme Spec(k), for which motivic cohomology is defined.) Although motivic cohomology $H^i(k, \Z(j))$ for fields k is far from understood in general, there is a description when i = j:

$$K_j^M(k) \cong H^j(k, \Z(j)),$$

where K_{j}^{M}(k) is the jth Milnor K-group of k. Since Milnor K-theory of a field is defined explicitly by generators and relations, this is a useful description of one piece of the motivic cohomology of k.

=== Map to étale cohomology ===
Let X be a smooth scheme over a field k, and let m be a positive integer which is invertible in k. Then there is a natural homomorphism (the cycle map) from motivic cohomology to étale cohomology:

$$H^i(X,\Z/m(j))\to H^i_{et}(X,\Z/m(j)),$$

where Z/m(j) on the right means the étale sheaf (μ_{m})^{⊗j}, with μ_{m} being the mth roots of unity. This generalizes the cycle map from the Chow ring of a smooth variety to étale cohomology.

A frequent goal in algebraic geometry or number theory is to compute motivic cohomology, whereas étale cohomology is often easier to understand. For example, if the base field k is the complex numbers, then étale cohomology coincides with singular cohomology (with finite coefficients). A powerful result proved by Voevodsky, known as the Beilinson-Lichtenbaum conjecture, says that many motivic cohomology groups are in fact isomorphic to étale cohomology groups. This is a consequence of the norm residue isomorphism theorem. Namely, the Beilinson-Lichtenbaum conjecture (Voevodsky's theorem) says that for a smooth scheme X over a field k and m a positive integer invertible in k, the cycle map

$$H^i(X,\Z/m(j))\to H^i_{et}(X,\Z/m(j))$$

is an isomorphism for all j ≥ i and is injective for all j ≥ i − 1.

=== Relation to motives ===
For any field k and commutative ring R, Voevodsky defined an R-linear triangulated category called the derived category of motives over k with coefficients in R, DM(k; R). Each scheme X over k determines two objects in DM called the motive of X, M(X), and the compactly supported motive of X, M^{c}(X); the two are isomorphic if X is proper over k.

One basic point of the derived category of motives is that the four types of motivic homology and motivic cohomology all arise as sets of morphisms in this category. To describe this, first note that there are Tate motives R(j) in DM(k; R) for all integers j, such that the motive of projective space is a direct sum of Tate motives:

$$M(\mathbf{P}^n_k)\cong \oplus_{j=0}^n R(j)[2j],$$

where M ↦ M[1] denotes the shift or "translation functor" in the triangulated category DM(k; R). In these terms, motivic cohomology (for example) is given by

$$H^i(X,R(j))\cong \text{Hom}_{DM(k; R)}(M(X),R(j)[i])$$

for every scheme X of finite type over k.

When the coefficients R are the rational numbers, a modern version of a conjecture by Beilinson predicts that the subcategory of compact objects in DM(k; Q) is equivalent to the bounded derived category of an abelian category MM(k), the category of mixed motives over k. In particular, the conjecture would imply that motivic cohomology groups can be identified with Ext groups in the category of mixed motives. This is far from known. Concretely, Beilinson's conjecture would imply the Beilinson-Soulé conjecture that H^{i}(X,Q(j)) is zero for i < 0, which is known only in a few cases.

Conversely, a variant of the Beilinson-Soulé conjecture, together with Grothendieck's standard conjectures and Murre's conjectures on Chow motives, would imply the existence of an abelian category MM(k) as the heart of a t-structure on DM(k; Q). More would be needed in order to identify Ext groups in MM(k) with motivic cohomology.

For k a subfield of the complex numbers, a candidate for the abelian category of mixed motives has been defined by Nori. If a category MM(k) with the expected properties exists (notably that the Betti realization functor from MM(k) to Q-vector spaces is faithful), then it must be equivalent to Nori's category.

== Applications to arithmetic geometry ==
=== Values of L-functions ===
Let X be a smooth projective variety over a number field. The Bloch-Kato conjecture on values of L-functions predicts that the order of vanishing of an L-function of X at an integer point is equal to the rank of a suitable motivic cohomology group. This is one of the central problems of number theory, incorporating earlier conjectures by Deligne and Beilinson. The Birch–Swinnerton-Dyer conjecture is a special case. More precisely, the conjecture predicts the leading coefficient of the L-function at an integer point in terms of regulators and a height pairing on motivic cohomology.

== History ==
In his 1973 development of higher algebraic K-theory, which naturally extended the Grothendieck group K_{0}, Quillen suggested that higher K-theory might eventually provide a theory of Chow rings for non-quasi-projective regular varieties. In the early 1980s, Beilinson and Soulé observed that Adams operations gave a splitting of algebraic K-theory tensored with the rationals; the summands are now called motivic cohomology (with rational coefficients). Beilinson and Lichtenbaum made influential conjectures predicting the existence and properties of motivic cohomology. Most but not all of their conjectures have now been proved. Bloch's definition of higher Chow groups (1986) was the first integral (as opposed to rational) definition of Borel-Moore motivic homology for quasi-projective varieties over a field k (and hence motivic cohomology, in the case of smooth varieties). The definition of higher Chow groups of X is a natural generalization of the definition of Chow groups, involving algebraic cycles on the product of X with affine space which meet a set of hyperplanes (viewed as the faces of a simplex) in the expected dimension.

In the 1990s, Voevodsky (building on his work with Suslin) defined the four types of motivic homology and motivic cohomology for smooth schemes over a perfect field, along with a triangulated category of motives inside a very robust framework of $\mathbb{A}^1$-homotopy theory. Different constructions were also given by Hanamura and Levine. These three triangulated categories of motives are now known to be equivalent, by work of Levine, Ivorra, and Bondarko.

Voevodsky also defined a motivic cohomology for singular varieties and used it in the proof of the Bloch-Kato conjecture. This has become known as cdh motivic cohomology, as it sits in an Atiyah–Hirzebruch style spectral sequence calculating homotopy-invariant algebraic K-theory (the cdh-localization of algebraic K-theory), rather than algebraic K-theory itself.

In recent years, motivic cohomology has been extended to arbitrary quasi-compact, quasi-separated schemes. Kelly and Saito define it using a procdh topology while, independently, Elmanto and Morrow and subsequently Bouis calculate it using trace methods. This qcqs motivic cohomology sits in an Atiyah–Hirzebruch style spectral sequence calculating algebraic K-theory.

== See also ==
- Presheaf with transfers
- A¹ homotopy theory
