= Eric Friedlander =

Puerto Rican mathematician

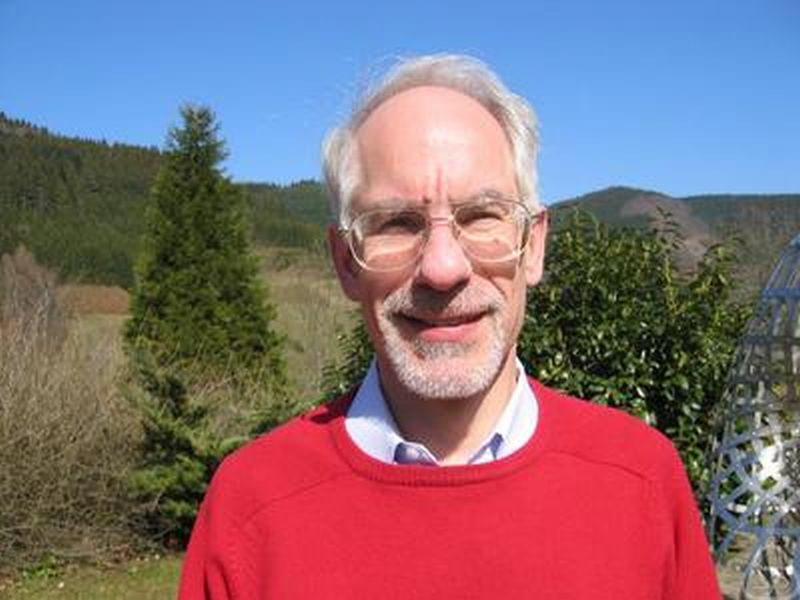
- Friedlander in 2004
- Born: January 7, 1944 (age 82); Santurce, San Juan, Puerto Rico
- Education: Swarthmore College (BA); Massachusetts Institute of Technology (PhD)
- Spouse: Susan Friedlander
- Awards: Humboldt Research Award (1996)
- Scientific career
- Fields: Algebraic topology
- Workplaces: Institute for Advanced Study; Northwestern University; University of Southern California
- Thesis: Fibrations in Étale Homotopy Theory (1970)
- Doctoral advisor: Michael Artin
- Doctoral students: David A. Cox

Eric Mark Friedlander (born January 7, 1944) is an American mathematician who is a professor of mathematics at University of Southern California. He is best known for his works in algebraic topology, algebraic geometry, algebraic K-theory and representation theory.

== Biography ==
Friedlander was born on January 7, 1944 in Santurce, Puerto Rico. He graduated from Swarthmore College with bachelor's degree in 1965 and in 1970 received a Ph.D. from the Massachusetts Institute of Technology, under the supervision of Michael Artin, (Fibrations in Étale Homotopy Theory). He was a postdoctoral instructor at Princeton University: a lecturer in 1971 and assistant professor in 1972. From 1973 to 1974, he was, through the US exchange program, at France, in particular at the Institut des Hautes Études Scientifiques. In 1975, he became an associate professor and in 1980 a professor at Northwestern University, where he was a chairman of the mathematics department from 1987 to 1990 and from 1999 to 2003. In 1999, he became Henry S. Noyes Professor of mathematics. As of 2008, he is Dean's Professor at the University of Southern California.

In 1981 and from 1985 to 1986, he was at the Institute for Advanced Study in Princeton, New Jersey. He received the Humboldt Research Award, while at the University of Heidelberg, from 1996 to 1998. He was also a visiting scholar and visiting professor at ETH Zurich, at the Max Planck Institute for Mathematics in Bonn, at the Mathematical Sciences Research Institute, in Oxford, Cambridge, Paris, at Brown University, the Hebrew University, and at the Institut Henri Poincaré. Since 2000, he has been on the Board of Trustees of the American Mathematical Society.

Friedlander is a co-editor of the Journal of Pure and Applied Algebra. In 1998, he was an invited speaker at the International Congress of Mathematicians in Berlin (Geometry of infinitesimal group schemes). In 2012 he became a fellow of the American Mathematical Society.

Friedlander is married to another mathematician, Susan Friedlander.

== Works ==
- With Andrei Suslin and Vladimir Voevodsky, Cycles, Transfers and Motivic Homology Theories, Annals of Mathematics Studies, Princeton University Press 2000 ISBN 978-0-691-04815-4.
- With Barry Mazur, Filtration on the Homology of Algebraic Varieties, memoir of the AMS, 1994 ISBN 978-0-8218-2591-4.
- Etale Homotopy of Simplicial Schemes, Annals of Mathematics Studies, Princeton University Press 1982 ISBN 978-0-691-08317-9.
- Editor with Daniel Grayson, Handbook of K-Theory, 2 volumes, Springer Verlag 2005 ISBN 978-3-540-23019-9.
- Editor with Spencer j. Bloch, R. k. Dennis, M.: Applications of algebraic K-theory to algebraic geometry and number theory, contemporary mathematics 55, 1986 ISBN 978-0-8218-5054-1.
- Editor with M. Stein, Algebraic K-theory (Evanston 1980), Springer Verlag, lecture notes in mathematics 854, 1981 ISBN 978-3-540-10698-2.
- Editor with Mark Mahowald, Topology and representation theory, contemporary mathematics, volume 158, American Mathematical Society, 1994 ISBN 0-8218-5165-9.
- With Charles Weibel, An overview over algebraic K-theory, in Algebraic K-theory and its applications, World Scientific 1999, pp. 1–119 (1997 Trieste of lecture notes) ISBN 981-02-3491-0.
