= Andrei Suslin =

Russian mathematician

- Born: 27 December 1950; Leningrad, Russian SFSR, Soviet Union
- Died: 10 July 2018 (aged 67); Saint Petersburg, Russia
- Education: Leningrad University
- Known for: Algebraic K-theory
- Awards: Petersburg Mathematical Society Prize (1977), Cole Prize (2000)
- Scientific career
- Fields: Mathematics
- Doctoral advisor: Mark Bashmakov
- Doctoral students: Ivan A. Panin

Andrei Aleksandrovich Suslin (Russian: Андре́й Алекса́ндрович Су́слин, sometimes transliterated Souslin) was a Russian mathematician who contributed to algebraic K-theory and its connections with algebraic geometry. He was a Trustee Chair and Professor of mathematics at Northwestern University.

He was born on 27 December 1950 in St. Petersburg, Russia. As a youth, he was an "all Leningrad" gymnast. He received his PhD from Leningrad University in 1974; his thesis was titled Projective modules over polynomial rings.

In 1976 he and Daniel Quillen independently proved Serre's conjecture about the triviality of algebraic vector bundles on affine space.

In 1982 he and Alexander Merkurjev proved the Merkurjev–Suslin theorem on the norm residue homomorphism in Milnor K2-theory, with applications to the Brauer group.

Suslin was an invited speaker at the International Congress of Mathematicians in 1978 and 1994, and he gave a plenary invited address at the Congress in 1986. He was awarded the Frank Nelson Cole Prize in Algebra in 2000 by the American Mathematical Society for his work on motivic cohomology.

In 2010 special issues of Journal of K-theory and of Documenta Mathematica have been published in honour of his 60th birthday.

He died in July 2018.
