= Markus Rost =

German mathematician

Markus Rost is a German mathematician who works at the intersection of topology and algebra. He was an invited speaker at the International Congress of Mathematicians in 2002 in Beijing, China. He is a professor at Bielefeld University.

He is known for his work on norm varieties (a key part in the proof of the Bloch–Kato conjecture) and for the Rost invariant (a cohomological invariant with values in Galois cohomology of degree 3). Together with J.-P. Serre he is one of the cofounders of the theory of cohomological invariants of linear algebraic groups. He has also made numerous contributions to the theory of torsors, quadratic forms, central simple algebras, Jordan algebras (the Rost-Serre invariant), exceptional groups, and essential dimension.

In 2012 he became a fellow of the American Mathematical Society.
