= Class formation =

In mathematics, a class formation is a topological group acting on a module satisfying certain conditions. Class formations were introduced by Emil Artin and John Tate to organize the various Galois groups and modules that appear in class field theory.

== Definitions ==
A formation is a topological group G together with a topological G-module A on which G acts continuously.

A layer E/F of a formation is a pair of open subgroups E, F of G such that F is a finite index subgroup of E. It is called a normal layer if F is a normal subgroup of E, and a cyclic layer if in addition the quotient group is cyclic. If E is a subgroup of G, then A^{E} is defined to be the elements of A fixed by E. We write

H^{n}(E/F)

for the Tate cohomology group H^{n}(E/F, A^{F}) whenever E/F is a normal layer. (Some authors think of E and F as fixed fields rather than subgroup of G, so write F/E instead of E/F.) In applications, G is often the absolute Galois group of a field, and in particular is profinite, and the open subgroups therefore correspond to the finite extensions of the field contained in some fixed separable closure.

A class formation is a formation such that for every normal layer E/F

H^{1}(E/F) is trivial, and
H^{2}(E/F) is cyclic of order |E/F|.

In practice, these cyclic groups come provided with canonical generators u_{E/F} ∈ H^{2}(E/F), called fundamental classes, that are compatible with each other in the sense that the restriction (of cohomology classes) of a fundamental class is another fundamental class. Often the fundamental classes are considered to be part of the structure of a class formation.

A formation that satisfies just the condition H^{1}(E/F)=1 is sometimes called a field formation. For example, if G is any finite group acting on a field L and A=L^{×}, then this is a field formation by Hilbert's theorem 90.

== Examples ==
The most important examples of class formations (arranged roughly in order of difficulty) are as follows:

- Archimedean local class field theory: The module A is the group of non-zero complex numbers, and G is either trivial or is the cyclic group of order 2 generated by complex conjugation.
- Finite fields: The module A is the integers (with trivial G-action), and G is the absolute Galois group of a finite field, which is isomorphic to the profinite completion of the integers.
- Local class field theory of characteristic p>0: The module A is the group of units of the separable algebraic closure of the field of formal Laurent series over a finite field, and G is the Galois group.
- Non-archimedean local class field theory of characteristic 0: The module A is the group of units of the algebraic closure of a field of p-adic numbers, and G is the Galois group.
- Global class field theory of characteristic p>0: The module A is the union of the groups of idele classes of separable finite extensions of some function field over a finite field, and G is the Galois group.
- Global class field theory of characteristic 0: The module A is the union of the groups of idele classes of algebraic number fields, and G is the Galois group of the rational numbers (or some algebraic number field) acting on A.

It is easy to verify the class formation property for the finite field case and the archimedean local field case, but the remaining cases are more difficult. Most of the hard work of class field theory consists of proving that these are indeed class formations. This is done in several steps, as described in the sections below.

== The first inequality ==
The first inequality of class field theory states that

|H^{0}(E/F)| ≥ |E/F|

for cyclic layers E/F. It is usually proved using properties of the Herbrand quotient, in the more precise form

|H^{0}(E/F)| = |E/F|×|H^{1}(E/F)|.

It is fairly straightforward to prove, because the Herbrand quotient is easy to work out, as it is multiplicative on short exact sequences, and is 1 for finite modules.

Before about 1950, the first inequality was known as the second inequality, and vice versa.

== The second inequality ==
The second inequality of class field theory states that

|H^{0}(E/F)| ≤ |E/F|

for all normal layers E/F.

For local fields, this inequality follows easily from Hilbert's theorem 90 together with the first inequality and some basic properties of group cohomology.

The second inequality was first proved for global fields by Weber using properties of the L series of number fields, as follows. Suppose that the layer E/F corresponds to an extension k⊂K of global fields. By studying the Dedekind zeta function of K one shows that the degree 1 primes of K have Dirichlet density given by the order of the pole at s=1, which is 1 (When K is the rationals, this is essentially Euler's proof that there are infinitely many primes using the pole at s=1 of the Riemann zeta function.) As each prime in k that is a norm is the product of deg(K/k)= |E/F| distinct degree 1 primes of K, this shows that the set of primes of k that are norms has density 1/|E/F|. On the other hand, by studying Dirichlet L-series of characters of the group H^{0}(E/F), one shows that the Dirichlet density of primes of k representing the trivial element of this group has density 1/|H^{0}(E/F)|. (This part of the proof is a generalization of Dirichlet's proof that there are infinitely many primes in arithmetic progressions.) But a prime represents a trivial element of the group H^{0}(E/F) if it is equal to a norm modulo principal ideals, so this set is at least as dense as the set of primes that are norms. So

1/|H^{0}(E/F)| ≥ 1/|E/F|

which is the second inequality.

In 1940 Chevalley found a purely algebraic proof of the second inequality, but it is longer and harder than Weber's original proof. Before about 1950, the second inequality was known as the first inequality; the name was changed because Chevalley's algebraic proof of it uses the first inequality.

Takagi defined a class field to be one where equality holds in the second inequality. By the Artin isomorphism below, H^{0}(E/F) is isomorphic to the abelianization of E/F, so equality in the second inequality holds exactly for abelian extensions, and class fields are the same as abelian extensions.

The first and second inequalities can be combined as follows. For cyclic layers, the two inequalities together prove that

H^{1}(E/F)|E/F| = H^{0}(E/F) ≤ |E/F|

so

H^{0}(E/F) = |E/F|

and

H^{1}(E/F) = 1.

Now a basic theorem about cohomology groups shows that since H^{1}(E/F) = 1 for all cyclic layers, we have

H^{1}(E/F) = 1

for all normal layers (so in particular the formation is a field formation). This proof that H^{1}(E/F) is always trivial is rather roundabout; no "direct" proof of it (whatever this means) for global fields is known. (For local fields the vanishing of H^{1}(E/F) is just Hilbert's theorem 90.)

For cyclic group, H^{0} is the same as H^{2}, so H^{2}(E/F) = |E/F| for all cyclic layers. Another theorem of group cohomology shows that since H^{1}(E/F) = 1 for all normal layers and H^{2}(E/F) ≤ |E/F| for all cyclic layers, we have

H^{2}(E/F)≤ |E/F|

for all normal layers. (In fact, equality holds for all normal layers, but this takes more work; see the next section.)

== The Brauer group ==
The Brauer groups H^{2}(E/*) of a class formation are defined to be the direct limit of the groups H^{2}(E/F) as F runs over all open subgroups of E. An easy consequence of the vanishing of H^{1} for all layers is that the groups H^{2}(E/F) are all subgroups of the Brauer group. In local class field theory the Brauer groups are the same as Brauer groups of fields, but in global class field theory the Brauer group of the formation is not the Brauer group of the corresponding global field (though they are related).

The next step is to prove that H^{2}(E/F) is cyclic of order exactly |E/F|; the previous section shows that it has at most this order, so it is sufficient to find some element of order |E/F| in H^{2}(E/F).

The proof for arbitrary extensions uses a homomorphism from the group G onto the profinite completion of the integers with kernel G_{∞}, or in other words a compatible sequence of homomorphisms of G onto the cyclic groups of order n for all n, with kernels G_{n}. These homomorphisms are constructed using cyclic cyclotomic extensions of fields; for finite fields they are given by the algebraic closure, for non-archimedean local fields they are given by the maximal unramified extensions, and for global fields they are slightly more complicated. As these extensions are given explicitly one can check that they have the property that H^{2}(G/G_{n}) is cyclic of order n, with a canonical generator. It follows from this that for any layer E, the group H^{2}(E/E∩G_{∞}) is canonically isomorphic to Q/Z. This idea of using roots of unity was introduced by Chebotarev in his proof of Chebotarev's density theorem, and used shortly afterwards by Artin to prove his reciprocity theorem.

For general layers E,F there is an exact sequence

$$0\rightarrow H^2(E/F)\cap H^2(E/E\cap G_\infty) \rightarrow H^2(E/E\cap G_\infty)\rightarrow H^2(F/F\cap G_\infty)$$

The last two groups in this sequence can both be identified with Q/Z and the map between them is then multiplication by |E/F|. So the first group is canonically isomorphic to Z/nZ. As H^{2}(E/F) has order at most Z/nZ is must be equal to Z/nZ (and in particular is contained in the middle group)).

This shows that the second cohomology group H^{2}(E/F) of any layer is cyclic of order |E/F|, which completes the verification of the axioms of a class formation. With a little more care in the proofs, we get a canonical generator of H^{2}(E/F), called the fundamental class.

It follows from this that the Brauer group H^{2}(E/*) is (canonically) isomorphic to the group Q/Z, except in the case of the archimedean local fields R and C when it has order 2 or 1.

== Tate's theorem and the Artin map ==
Tate's theorem in group cohomology is as follows. Suppose that A is a module over a finite group G and a is an element of H^{2}(G,A), such that for every subgroup E of G

- H^{1}(E,A) is trivial, and
- H^{2}(E,A) is generated by Res(a) which has order E.

Then cup product with a is an isomorphism

- H^{n}(G,Z) → H^{n+2}(G,A).

If we apply the case n=−2 of Tate's theorem to a class formation, we find that there is an isomorphism

- H^{−2}(E/F,Z) → H^{0}(E/F,A^{F})

for any normal layer E/F. The group H^{−2}(E/F,Z) is just the abelianization of E/F, and the group H^{0}(E/F,A^{F}) is A^{E} modulo the group of norms of A^{F}. In other words, we have an explicit description of the abelianization of the Galois group E/F in terms of A^{E}.

Taking the inverse of this isomorphism gives a homomorphism

A^{E} → abelianization of E/F,

and taking the limit over all open subgroups F gives a homomorphism

A^{E} → abelianization of E,

called the Artin map. The Artin map is not necessarily surjective, but has dense image. By the existence theorem below its kernel is the connected component of A^{E} (for class field theory), which is trivial for class field theory of non-archimedean local fields and for function fields, but is non-trivial for archimedean local fields and number fields.

== The Takagi existence theorem ==
The main remaining theorem of class field theory is the Takagi existence theorem, which states that every finite index closed subgroup of the idele class group is the group of norms corresponding to some abelian extension. The classical way to prove this is to construct some extensions with small groups of norms, by first adding in many roots of unity, and then taking Kummer extensions and Artin–Schreier extensions. These extensions may be non-abelian (though they are extensions of abelian groups by abelian groups); however, this does not really matter, as the norm group of a non-abelian Galois extension is the same as that of its maximal abelian extension (this can be shown using what we already know about class fields). This gives enough (abelian) extensions to show that there is an abelian extension corresponding to any finite index subgroup of the idele class group.

A consequence is that the kernel of the Artin map is the connected component of the identity of the idele class group, so that the abelianization of the Galois group of F is the profinite completion of the idele class group.

For local class field theory, it is also possible to construct abelian extensions more explicitly using Lubin–Tate formal group laws. For global fields, the abelian extensions can be constructed explicitly in some cases: for example, the abelian extensions of the rationals can be constructed using roots of unity, and the abelian extensions of quadratic imaginary fields can be constructed using elliptic functions, but finding an analog of this for arbitrary global fields is an unsolved problem.

== Weil group ==
This is not a Weyl group and has no connection with the Weil–Châtelet group or the Mordell–Weil group

The Weil group of a class formation with fundamental classes u_{E/F} ∈ H^{2}(E/F, A^{F}) is a kind of modified Galois group, introduced by Weil (1951) and used in various formulations of class field theory, and in particular in the Langlands program.

If E/F is a normal layer, then the Weil group U of E/F is the extension

1 → A^{F} → U → E/F → 1

corresponding to the fundamental class u_{E/F} in H^{2}(E/F, A^{F}). The Weil group of the whole formation is defined to be the inverse limit of the Weil groups of all the layers G/F, for F an open subgroup of G.

The reciprocity map of the class formation (G, A) induces an isomorphism from A^{G} to the abelianization of the Weil group.

== See also ==
- Abelian extension
- Artin L-function
- Artin reciprocity
- Class field theory
- Complex multiplication
- Galois cohomology
- Hasse norm theorem
- Herbrand quotient
- Hilbert class field
- Kronecker–Weber theorem
- Local class field theory
- Takagi existence theorem
- Tate cohomology group
