= Barratt–Priddy theorem =

Connects the homology of the symmetric groups with mapping spaces of spheres

In homotopy theory, a branch of mathematics, the Barratt–Priddy theorem (also referred to as Barratt–Priddy–Quillen theorem) expresses a connection between the homology of the symmetric groups and mapping spaces of spheres. The theorem (named after Michael Barratt, Stewart Priddy, and Daniel Quillen) is also often stated as a relation between the sphere spectrum and the classifying spaces of the symmetric groups via Quillen's plus construction.

== Statement of the theorem ==
The mapping space $\operatorname{Map}_0(S^n,S^n)$ is the topological space of all continuous maps $f\colon S^n \to S^n$ from the n-dimensional sphere $S^n$ to itself, under the topology of uniform convergence (a special case of the compact-open topology). These maps are required to fix a basepoint $x\in S^n$, satisfying $f(x)=x$, and to have degree 0; this guarantees that the mapping space is connected. The Barratt–Priddy theorem expresses a relation between the homology of these mapping spaces and the homology of the symmetric groups $\Sigma_n$.

It follows from the Freudenthal suspension theorem and the Hurewicz theorem that the kth homology $H_k(\operatorname{Map}_0(S^n,S^n))$ of this mapping space is independent of the dimension n, as long as $n>k$. Similarly, Minoru Nakaoka (1960) proved that the kth group homology $H_k(\Sigma_n)$ of the symmetric group $\Sigma_n$ on n elements is independent of n, as long as $n \ge 2k$. This is an instance of homological stability.

The Barratt–Priddy theorem states that these "stable homology groups" are the same: for $n \ge 2k$, there is a natural isomorphism

$$H_k(\Sigma_n)\cong H_k(\text{Map}_0(S^n,S^n)).$$

This isomorphism holds with integral coefficients (in fact with any coefficients, as is made clear in the reformulation below).

== Example: first homology ==
This isomorphism can be seen explicitly for the first homology $H_1$. The first homology of a group is the largest commutative quotient of that group. For the permutation groups $\Sigma_n$, the only commutative quotient is given by the sign of a permutation, taking values in {−1, 1}. This shows that $H_1(\Sigma_n) \cong \Z/2\Z$, the cyclic group of order 2, for all $n\ge 2$. (For $n= 1$, $\Sigma_1$ is the trivial group, so $H_1(\Sigma_1) = 0$.)

It follows from the theory of covering spaces that the mapping space $\operatorname{Map}_0(S^1,S^1)$ of the circle $S^1$ is contractible, so $H_1(\operatorname{Map}_0(S^1,S^1))=0$. For the 2-sphere $S^2$, the first homotopy group and first homology group of the mapping space are both infinite cyclic:

$$\pi_1(\operatorname{Map}_0(S^2,S^2))=H_1(\operatorname{Map}_0(S^2,S^2))\cong \Z$$.

A generator for this group can be built from the Hopf fibration $S^3 \to S^2$. Finally, once $n\ge 3$, both are cyclic of order 2:

$$\pi_1(\operatorname{Map}_0(S^n,S^n))=H_1(\operatorname{Map}_0(S^n,S^n))\cong \Z/2\Z$$.

== Reformulation of the theorem ==
The infinite symmetric group $\Sigma_{\infty}$ is the union of the finite symmetric groups $\Sigma_{n}$, and Nakaoka's theorem implies that the group homology of $\Sigma_{\infty}$ is the stable homology of $\Sigma_{n}$: for $n\ge 2k$,

$$H_k(\Sigma_{\infty}) \cong H_k(\Sigma_{n})$$.

The classifying space of this group is denoted $B \Sigma_{\infty}$, and its homology of this space is the group homology of $\Sigma_{\infty}$:

$$H_k(B \Sigma_{\infty})\cong H_k(\Sigma_{\infty})$$.

We similarly denote by $\operatorname{Map}_0(S^{\infty},S^{\infty})$ the union of the mapping spaces $\operatorname{Map}_0(S^{n},S^{n})$ under the inclusions induced by suspension. The homology of $\operatorname{Map}_0(S^{\infty},S^{\infty})$ is the stable homology of the previous mapping spaces: for $n>k$,

$$H_k(\operatorname{Map}_0(S^{\infty},S^{\infty})) \cong H_k(\operatorname{Map}_0(S^{n},S^{n})).$$

There is a natural map $\varphi\colon B\Sigma_{\infty} \to \operatorname{Map}_0(S^{\infty},S^{\infty})$; one way to construct this map is via the model of $B\Sigma_{\infty}$ as the space of finite subsets of $\R^{\infty}$ endowed with an appropriate topology. An equivalent formulation of the Barratt–Priddy theorem is that $\varphi$ is a homology equivalence (or acyclic map), meaning that $\varphi$ induces an isomorphism on all homology groups with any local coefficient system.

== Relation with Quillen's plus construction ==
The Barratt–Priddy theorem implies that the space BΣ_{∞}^{+} resulting from applying Quillen's plus construction to BΣ_{∞} can be identified with Map_{0}(S^{∞},S^{∞}). (Since π_{1}(Map_{0}(S^{∞},S^{∞}))≅H_{1}(Σ_{∞})≅Z/2Z, the map φ: BΣ_{∞}→Map_{0}(S^{∞},S^{∞}) satisfies the universal property of the plus construction once it is known that φ is a homology equivalence.)

The mapping spaces Map_{0}(S^{n},S^{n}) are more commonly denoted by Ω^{n}_{0}S^{n}, where Ω^{n}S^{n} is the n-fold loop space of the n-sphere S^{n}, and similarly Map_{0}(S^{∞},S^{∞}) is denoted by Ω^{∞}_{0}S^{∞}. Therefore the Barratt–Priddy theorem can also be stated as

$B\Sigma_\infty^+\simeq \Omega_0^\infty S^\infty$ or

$$\textbf{Z}\times B\Sigma_\infty^+\simeq \Omega^\infty S^\infty$$

In particular, the homotopy groups of BΣ_{∞}^{+} are the stable homotopy groups of spheres:

$$\pi_i(B\Sigma_\infty^+)\cong \pi_i(\Omega^\infty S^\infty)\cong \lim_{n\rightarrow \infty} \pi_{n+i}(S^n)=\pi_i^s(S^n)$$

== "K-theory of F_{1}" ==
The Barratt–Priddy theorem is sometimes colloquially rephrased as saying that "the K-groups of F_{1} are the stable homotopy groups of spheres". This is not a meaningful mathematical statement, but a metaphor expressing an analogy with algebraic K-theory.

The "field with one element" F_{1} is not a mathematical object; it refers to a collection of analogies between algebra and combinatorics. One central analogy is the idea that GL_{n}(F_{1}) should be the symmetric group Σ_{n}. The higher K-groups K_{i}(R) of a ring R can be defined as

$$K_i(R)=\pi_i(BGL_\infty(R)^+)$$

According to this analogy, the K-groups K_{i}(F_{1}) of F_{1} should be defined as π_{i}(BGL_{∞}(F_{1})^{+})=π_{i}(BΣ_{∞}^{+}), which by the Barratt–Priddy theorem is:

$$K_i(\mathbf{F}_1)=\pi_i(BGL_\infty(\mathbf{F}_1)^+)=\pi_i(B\Sigma_\infty^+)=\pi_i^s.$$
