= Herbrand quotient =

In mathematics, the Herbrand quotient is a quotient of orders of cohomology groups of a cyclic group. It was invented by Jacques Herbrand. It has an important application in class field theory.

== Definition ==
If G is a finite cyclic group acting on a G-module A, then the cohomology groups H^{n}(G,A) have period 2 for n≥1; in other words

H^{n}(G,A) = H^{n+2}(G,A),

an isomorphism induced by cup product with a generator of H^{2}(G,Z). (If instead we use the Tate cohomology groups then the periodicity extends down to n=0.)

A Herbrand module is an A for which the cohomology groups are finite. In this case, the Herbrand quotient h(G,A) is defined to be the quotient

h(G,A) = |H^{2}(G,A)|/|H^{1}(G,A)|

of the order of the even and odd cohomology groups.

=== Alternative definition ===
The quotient may be defined for a pair of endomorphisms of an Abelian group, f and g, which satisfy the condition fg = gf = 0. Their Herbrand quotient q(f,g) is defined as

$$q(f,g) = \frac{|\mathrm{ker} f:\mathrm{im} g|}{|\mathrm{ker} g:\mathrm{im} f|}$$

if the two indices are finite. If G is a cyclic group with generator γ acting on an Abelian group A, then we recover the previous definition by taking f = 1 - γ and g = 1 + γ + γ^{2} + ... .

== Properties ==
- The Herbrand quotient is multiplicative on short exact sequences. In other words, if

0 → A → B → C → 0

is exact, and any two of the quotients are defined, then so is the third and

h(G,B) = h(G,A)h(G,C)

- If A is finite then h(G,A) = 1.
- For A is a submodule of the G-module B of finite index, if either quotient is defined then so is the other and they are equal: more generally, if there is a G-morphism A → B with finite kernel and cokernel then the same holds.
- If Z is the integers with G acting trivially, then h(G,Z) = |G|
- If A is a finitely generated G-module, then the Herbrand quotient h(A) depends only on the complex G-module C⊗A (and so can be read off from the character of this complex representation of G).

These properties mean that the Herbrand quotient is usually relatively easy to calculate, and is often much easier to calculate than the orders of either of the individual cohomology groups.

== See also ==
- Class formation
