= Transgression map =

Concept in algebraic topology

In algebraic topology, a transgression map is a way to transfer cohomology classes. It occurs, for example in the inflation-restriction exact sequence in group cohomology, and in integration in fibers. It also naturally arises in many spectral sequences; see spectral sequence#Edge maps and transgressions.

== Inflation-restriction exact sequence ==
The transgression map appears in the inflation-restriction exact sequence, an exact sequence occurring in group cohomology. Let G be a group, N a normal subgroup, and A an abelian group which is equipped with an action of G, i.e., a homomorphism from G to the automorphism group of A. The quotient group $G/N$ acts on

$$A^N = \{ a \in A : na = a \text{ for all } n \in N\}.$$

Then the inflation-restriction exact sequence is:

$$0 \to H^1(G/N, A^N) \to H^1(G, A) \to H^1(N, A)^{G/N} \to H^2(G/N, A^N) \to H^2(G, A).$$

The transgression map is the map $H^1(N, A)^{G/N} \to H^2(G/N, A^N)$.

Transgression is defined for general $n\in \N$,

$$H^n(N, A)^{G/N} \to H^{n+1}(G/N, A^N)$$,

only if $H^i(N, A)^{G/N} = 0$ for $i\le n-1$.
