= Five-term exact sequence =

Sequence of terms related to the first step of a spectral sequence

In mathematics, five-term exact sequence or exact sequence of low-degree terms is a sequence of terms related to the first step of a spectral sequence.

More precisely, let

$$E_2^{p,q} \Rightarrow H^n(A)$$

be a first quadrant spectral sequence, meaning that $E_2^{p,q}$ vanishes except when p and q are both non-negative. Then there is an exact sequence

0 → E_{2}^{1,0} → H^{1}(A) → E_{2}^{0,1} → E_{2}^{2,0} → H^{2}(A).

Here, the map $E_2^{0,1} \to E_2^{2,0}$ is the differential of the $E_2$-term of the spectral sequence.

== Example ==
- The inflation-restriction exact sequence

0 → H^{1}(G/N, A^{N}) → H^{1}(G, A) → H^{1}(N, A)^{G/N} → H^{2}(G/N, A^{N}) →H^{2}(G, A)

in group cohomology arises as the five-term exact sequence associated to the Lyndon–Hochschild–Serre spectral sequence

H^{p}(G/N, H^{q}(N, A)) ⇒ H^{p+q}(G, A)

where G is a profinite group, N is a closed normal subgroup, and A is a discrete G-module.

== Construction ==
The sequence is a consequence of the definition of convergence of a spectral sequence. The second page differential with codomain E_{2}^{1,0} originates from E_{2}^{−1,1}, which is zero by assumption. The differential with domain E_{2}^{1,0} has codomain E_{2}^{3,−1}, which is also zero by assumption. Similarly, the incoming and outgoing differentials of E_{r}^{1,0} are zero for all r ≥ 2. Therefore the (1,0) term of the spectral sequence has converged, meaning that it is isomorphic to the degree one graded piece of the abutment H^{1}(A). Because the spectral sequence lies in the first quadrant, the degree one graded piece is equal to the first subgroup in the filtration defining the graded pieces. The inclusion of this subgroup yields the injection E_{2}^{1,0} → H^{1}(A) which begins the five-term exact sequence. This injection is called an edge map.

The E_{2}^{0,1} term of the spectral sequence has not converged. It has a potentially non-trivial differential leading to E_{2}^{2,0}. However, the differential landing at E_{2}^{0,1} begins at E_{2}^{−2,2}, which is zero, and therefore E_{3}^{0,1} is the kernel of the differential E_{2}^{0,1} → E_{2}^{2,0}. At the third page, the (0, 1) term of the spectral sequence has converged, because all the differentials into and out of E_{r}^{0,1} either begin or end outside the first quadrant when r ≥ 3. Consequently E_{3}^{0,1} is the degree zero graded piece of H^{1}(A). This graded piece is the quotient of H^{1}(A) by the first subgroup in the filtration, and hence it is the cokernel of the edge map from E_{2}^{1,0}. This yields a short exact sequence

0 → E_{2}^{1,0} → H^{1}(A) → E_{3}^{0,1} → 0.

Because E_{3}^{0,1} is the kernel of the differential E_{2}^{0,1} → E_{2}^{2,0}, the last term in the short exact sequence can be replaced with the differential. This produces a four-term exact sequence. The map H^{1}(A) → E_{2}^{0,1} is also called an edge map.

The outgoing differential of E_{2}^{2,0} is zero, so E_{3}^{2,0} is the cokernel of the differential E_{2}^{0,1} → E_{2}^{2,0}. The incoming and outgoing differentials of E_{r}^{2,0} are zero if r ≥ 3, again because the spectral sequence lies in the first quadrant, and hence the spectral sequence has converged. Consequently E_{3}^{2,0} is isomorphic to the degree two graded piece of H^{2}(A). In particular, it is a subgroup of H^{2}(A). The composite E_{2}^{2,0} → E_{3}^{2,0} → H^{2}(A), which is another edge map, therefore has kernel equal to the image of the differential landing at E_{2}^{2,0}. This completes the construction of the sequence.

== Variations ==
The five-term exact sequence can be extended at the cost of making one of the terms less explicit. The seven-term exact sequence is

0 → E_{2}^{1,0} → H^{1}(A) → E_{2}^{0,1} → E_{2}^{2,0} → Ker(H^{2}(A) → E_{2}^{0,2}) → E_{2}^{1,1} → E_{2}^{3,0}.

This sequence does not immediately extend with a map to H^{3}(A). While there is an edge map E_{2}^{3,0} → H^{3}(A), its kernel is not the previous term in the seven-term exact sequence.

For spectral sequences whose first interesting page is E_{1}, there is a three-term exact sequence analogous to the five-term exact sequence:

$$0 \to H^0(A) \to E_1^{0,0} \to E_1^{0,1}.$$

Similarly for a homological spectral sequence $E_{p,q}^2 \Rightarrow H_n(A)$ we get an exact sequence:

$$H_2(A)\to E^2_{2,0}\xrightarrow{d_2}E^2_{0,1}\to H_1(A)\to E^2_{1,0}\to 0$$

In both homological and cohomological case there are also low degree exact sequences for spectral sequences in the third quadrant. When additional terms of the spectral sequence are known to vanish, the exact sequences can sometimes be extended further. For example, the long exact sequence associated to a short exact sequence of complexes can be derived in this manner.
