= Tate cohomology group =

In mathematics, Tate cohomology groups are a slightly modified form of the usual cohomology groups of a finite group that combine homology and cohomology groups into one sequence. They were introduced by John Tate (1952, p. 297), and are used in class field theory.

== Definition ==
If $G$ is a finite group and $A$ a $G$-module, then there is a natural map $N$ from $H_0(G,A)$ to $H^0(G,A)$ taking a representative $a$ to $\sum_{g\in G} ga$ (the sum over all $G$-conjugates of $a$). The Tate cohomology groups $\hat H^n(G,A)$ are defined by:

- $\hat H^n(G,A) = H^n(G,A)$ for $n\ge 1$,
- $\hat H^0(G,A)=\operatorname {coker} N=$ quotient of $H^0(G,A)$ by norms of elements of $A$,
- $\hat H^{-1}(G,A)=\ker N=$ quotient of norm $0$ elements of $A$ by principal elements of $A$,
- $\hat H^{n}(G,A) = H_{-n - 1}(G,A)$ for $n\le -2$.

== Properties ==
- If

$$0 \longrightarrow A \longrightarrow B \longrightarrow C \longrightarrow 0$$

is a short exact sequence of G-modules, then we get the usual long exact sequence of Tate cohomology groups:

$$\cdots \longrightarrow\hat H^{n}(G,A)\longrightarrow\hat H^{n}(G,B)\longrightarrow\hat H^{n}(G,C)\longrightarrow\hat H^{n+1}(G,A)\longrightarrow\hat H^{n+1}(G,B)\cdots$$

- If A is an induced G module (meaning, induced from a module for the trivial group) then all Tate cohomology groups of A vanish.
- The zeroth Tate cohomology group of A is

(Fixed points of G on A)/(Obvious fixed points of G acting on A)

where by the "obvious" fixed point we mean those of the form $\sum g a$. In other words, the zeroth cohomology group in some sense describes the non-obvious fixed points of G acting on A.

The Tate cohomology groups are characterized by the three properties above.

== Tate's theorem ==
Tate's theorem (Tate 1952) gives conditions for multiplication by a cohomology class to be an isomorphism between cohomology groups. There are several slightly different versions of it; a version that is particularly convenient for class field theory is as follows:

Suppose that A is a module over a finite group G and a is an element of $H^2(G,A)$, such that for every subgroup E of G

- $H^1(E,A)$ is trivial, and
- $H^2(E,A)$ is generated by $\operatorname{Res}(a)$, which has order E.

Then cup product with a is an isomorphism:

- $\hat H^n(G,\Z)\longrightarrow\hat H^{n+2}(G,A)$

for all n; in other words the graded Tate cohomology of A is isomorphic to the Tate cohomology with integral coefficients, with the degree shifted by 2.

== Tate-Farrell cohomology ==
F. Thomas Farrell extended Tate cohomology groups to the case of all groups G of finite virtual cohomological dimension. In Farrell's theory, the groups $\hat H^n(G,A)$ are isomorphic to the usual cohomology groups whenever n is greater than the virtual cohomological dimension of the group G. Finite groups have virtual cohomological dimension 0, and in this case Farrell's cohomology groups are the same as those of Tate.

== See also ==
- Herbrand quotient
- Class formation
