= Lyndon–Hochschild–Serre spectral sequence =

Topic in mathematics

In mathematics, especially in the fields of group cohomology, homological algebra and number theory, the Lyndon spectral sequence or Hochschild–Serre spectral sequence is a spectral sequence relating the group cohomology of a normal subgroup N and the quotient group G/N to the cohomology of the total group G. The spectral sequence is named after Roger Lyndon, Gerhard Hochschild, and Jean-Pierre Serre.

== Statement ==
Let $G$ be a group and $N$ be a normal subgroup. The latter ensures that the quotient $G/N$ is a group, as well. Finally, let $A$ be a $G$-module. Then there is a spectral sequence of cohomological type

$$H^p(G/N,H^q(N,A)) \Longrightarrow H^{p+q}(G,A)$$

and there is a spectral sequence of homological type

$$H_p(G/N,H_q(N,A)) \Longrightarrow H_{p+q}(G,A)$$,

where the arrow '$\Longrightarrow$' means convergence of spectral sequences.

The same statement holds if $G$ is a profinite group, $N$ is a closed normal subgroup and $H^*$ denotes the continuous cohomology.

== Examples ==
=== Homology of the Heisenberg group ===
The spectral sequence can be used to compute the homology of the Heisenberg group G with integral entries, i.e., matrices of the form

$$\left ( \begin{array}{ccc} 1 & a & c \\ 0 & 1 & b \\ 0 & 0 & 1 \end{array} \right ), \ a, b, c \in \Z.$$

This group is a central extension

$$0 \to \Z \to G \to \Z \oplus \Z \to 0$$

with center $\Z$ corresponding to the subgroup with $a=b=0$. The spectral sequence for the group homology, together with the analysis of a differential in this spectral sequence, shows that

$$H_i (G, \Z) = \left \{ \begin{array}{cc} \Z & i=0, 3 \\ \Z \oplus \Z & i=1,2 \\ 0 & i>3. \end{array} \right.$$

=== Cohomology of wreath products ===
For a group G, the wreath product is an extension

$$1 \to G^p \to G \wr \Z / p \to \Z / p \to 1.$$

The resulting spectral sequence of group cohomology with coefficients in a field k,

$$H^r(\Z/p, H^s(G^p, k)) \Rightarrow H^{r+s}(G \wr \Z/p, k),$$

is known to degenerate at the $E_2$-page.

== Properties ==
The associated five-term exact sequence to the group cohomology is the usual inflation-restriction exact sequence:

$$0 \to H^1(G/N,A^N) \xrightarrow{\text{inf}} H^1(G,A) \xrightarrow{\text{res}}
H^1(N,A)^{G/N} \xrightarrow{d} H^2(G/N,A^N) \xrightarrow{\text{inf}} H^2(G,A).$$

The associated five-term exact sequence to the group homology is the coinflation-corestriction exact sequence:

$$H_2(G, A) \xrightarrow{\text{coinf}} H_2(G/N, A_N) \xrightarrow{d}
H_1(N, A)_{G/N} \xrightarrow{\text{cor}} H_1(G, A) \xrightarrow{\text{coinf}} H_1(G/N, A_N) \to 0.$$

== Generalizations ==
The spectral sequence is an instance of the more general Grothendieck spectral sequence of the composition of two derived functors. Indeed, $H^{*}(G,-)$ is the derived functor of $(-)^G$ (i.e., taking G-invariants) and the composition of the functors $(-)^N$ and $(-)^{G/N}$ is exactly $(-)^G$.

A similar spectral sequence exists for group homology, as opposed to group cohomology.

A similar spectral sequence exists for Lie algebras.
