= Form class =

Form class may refer to:

- Form classification, in paleontology
- Homeroom, in schools
- Part of speech, in grammar

== See also ==
- Class (disambiguation)
- Form (disambiguation)
- Class formation (mathematics)
