= Chebotaryov =

Chebotaryov (masculine) or Chebotaryova (feminine) is a Russian surname, also spelled "Chebotarov", "Chebotarev", "Tschebotaröw", "Чеботарёв". Ukrainian-language variant: Chobotaryov (Чоботарьов), Belarusian: Chabatarow (Чабатароў).

It is associated with the old Russian noble Chebotaryov family. Notable people with the surname include:

- Konstantin Chebotaryov (1892–1974), Soviet painter
- Nikolai Chebotaryov (1894–1947), Russian and Soviet mathematician
- Gleb Chebotaryov (1913–1975), Soviet astronomer
- Nikolai Chebotarev, claimed identity of Tsarevich Alexei Nikolaevich of Russia, Romanov impostors
- Sergey Chebotaryov (born 1969), Russian politician
- Valentina Chebotaryova (died 1919), Red Cross nurse during World War I
- Vladimir Chebotaryov (1921–2010), Soviet and Russian film director
- Gregory Tschebotarioff (1899–1985), Russian-born American civil engineer and son of Valentina Chebotaryova

== See also ==
- 1804 Chebotarev, asteroid
