= Homological stability =

Type of mathematical theorem

In mathematics, homological stability is any of a number of theorems asserting that the group homology of a series of groups $G_1 \subset G_2 \subset \cdots$ is stable, i.e.,

$$H_i(G_n)$$

is independent of n when n is large enough (depending on i). The smallest n such that the maps $H_i(G_n) \to H_i(G_{n+1})$ is an isomorphism is referred to as the stable range. The concept of homological stability was pioneered by Daniel Quillen whose proof technique has been adapted in various situations.

== Examples ==
Examples of such groups include the following:

| group | name |
|---|---|
| symmetric group $S_n$ | Nakaoka stability |
| braid group $B_n$ | |
| general linear group $\operatorname{GL}_n(R)$ for (certain) rings R | |
| mapping class group of surfaces (n is the genus of the surface) | Harer stability |
| automorphism group of free groups, $\operatorname{Aut}(F_n)$ | |

== Applications ==
In some cases, the homology of the group

$$G_\infty = \bigcup_n G_n$$

can be computed by other means or is related to other data. For example, the Barratt–Priddy theorem relates the homology of the infinite symmetric group agrees with mapping spaces of spheres. This can also be stated as a relation between the plus construction of $\operatorname{BS}_\infty$ and the sphere spectrum. In a similar vein, the homology of $\operatorname{GL}_\infty(R)$ is related, via the +-construction, to the algebraic K-theory of R.
