= Integration along fibers =

In differential geometry, the integration along fibers of a k-form yields a $(k-m)$-form where m is the dimension of the fiber, via "integration". It is also called the fiber integration.

== Definition ==
Let $\pi: E \to B$ be a fiber bundle over a manifold with compact oriented fibers. If $\alpha$ is a k-form on E, then for tangent vectors w_{i}'s at b, let

$$(\pi_* \alpha)_b(w_1, \dots, w_{k-m}) = \int_{\pi^{-1}(b)} \beta$$

where $\beta$ is the induced top-form on the fiber $\pi^{-1}(b)$; i.e., an $m$-form given by: with $\widetilde{w_i}$ lifts of $w_i$ to $E$,

$$\beta(v_1, \dots, v_m) = \alpha(v_1, \dots, v_m, \widetilde{w_1}, \dots, \widetilde{w_{k-m}}).$$

(To see $b \mapsto (\pi_* \alpha)_b$ is smooth, work it out in coordinates; cf. an example below.)

Then $\pi_*$ is a linear map $\Omega^k(E) \to \Omega^{k-m}(B)$. By Stokes' formula, if the fibers have no boundaries(i.e. $[d,\int]=0$), the map descends to de Rham cohomology:

$$\pi_*: \operatorname{H}^k(E; \mathbb{R}) \to \operatorname{H}^{k-m}(B; \mathbb{R}).$$

This is also called the fiber integration.

Now, suppose $\pi$ is a sphere bundle; i.e., the typical fiber is a sphere. Then there is an exact sequence $0 \to K \to \Omega^*(E) \overset{\pi_*}\to \Omega^*(B) \to 0$, K the kernel, which leads to a long exact sequence, dropping the coefficient $\mathbb{R}$ and using $\operatorname{H}^k(B) \simeq \operatorname{H}^{k+m}(K)$:

$$\cdots \rightarrow \operatorname{H}^k(B) \overset{\delta}\to \operatorname{H}^{k+m+1}(B) \overset{\pi^*} \rightarrow \operatorname{H}^{k+m+1}(E) \overset{\pi_*} \rightarrow \operatorname{H}^{k+1}(B) \rightarrow \cdots$$,

called the Gysin sequence.

== Example ==
Let $\pi: M \times [0, 1] \to M$ be an obvious projection. First assume $M = \mathbb{R}^n$ with coordinates $x_j$ and consider a k-form:

$$\alpha = f \, dx_{i_1} \wedge \dots \wedge dx_{i_k} + g \, dt \wedge dx_{j_1} \wedge \dots \wedge dx_{j_{k-1}}.$$

Then, at each point in M,

$\pi_*(\alpha) = \pi_*(g \, dt \wedge dx_{j_1} \wedge \dots \wedge dx_{j_{k-1}}) = \left( \int_0^1 g(\cdot, t) \, dt \right) \, {dx_{j_1} \wedge \dots \wedge dx_{j_{k-1}}}.$

From this local calculation, the next formula follows easily (see Poincaré_lemma#Direct_proof): if $\alpha$ is any k-form on $M \times [0, 1],$

$$\pi_*(d \alpha) = \alpha_1 - \alpha_0 - d \pi_*(\alpha)$$

where $\alpha_i$ is the restriction of $\alpha$ to $M \times \{i\}$.

As an application of this formula, let $f: M \times [0, 1] \to N$ be a smooth map (thought of as a homotopy). Then the composition $h = \pi_* \circ f^*$ is a homotopy operator (also called a chain homotopy):

$$d \circ h + h \circ d = f_1^* - f_0^*: \Omega^k(N) \to \Omega^k(M),$$

which implies $f_1, f_0$ induce the same map on cohomology, the fact known as the homotopy invariance of de Rham cohomology. As a corollary, for example, let U be an open ball in R^{n} with center at the origin and let $f_t: U \to U, x \mapsto tx$. Then $\operatorname{H}^k(U; \mathbb{R}) = \operatorname{H}^k(pt; \mathbb{R})$, the fact known as the Poincaré lemma.

== Projection formula ==
Given a vector bundle π : E → B over a manifold, we say a differential form α on E has vertical-compact support if the restriction $\alpha|_{\pi^{-1}(b)}$ has compact support for each b in B. We write $\Omega_{vc}^*(E)$ for the vector space of differential forms on E with vertical-compact support. If E is oriented as a vector bundle, exactly as before, we can define the integration along the fiber:

$$\pi_*: \Omega_{vc}^*(E) \to \Omega^*(B).$$

The following is known as the projection formula. We make $\Omega_{vc}^*(E)$ a right $\Omega^*(B)$-module by setting $\alpha \cdot \beta = \alpha \wedge \pi^* \beta$.

Proposition—Let $\pi: E \to B$ be an oriented vector bundle over a manifold and $\pi_*$ the integration along the fiber. Then

1. $\pi_*$ is $\Omega^*(B)$-linear; i.e., for any form β on B and any form α on E with vertical-compact support,
  $$\pi_*(\alpha \wedge \pi^* \beta) = \pi_* \alpha \wedge \beta.$$
2. If B is oriented as a manifold, then for any form α on E with vertical compact support and any form β on B with compact support,
  $$\int_E \alpha \wedge \pi^* \beta = \int_B \pi_* \alpha \wedge \beta$$.

Proof: 1. Since the assertion is local, we can assume π is trivial: i.e., $\pi: E = B \times \mathbb{R}^n \to B$ is a projection. Let $t_j$ be the coordinates on the fiber. If $\alpha = g \, dt_1 \wedge \cdots \wedge dt_n \wedge \pi^* \eta$, then, since $\pi^*$ is a ring homomorphism,

$$\pi_*(\alpha \wedge \pi^* \beta) = \left( \int_{\mathbb{R}^n} g(\cdot, t_1, \dots, t_n) dt_1 \dots dt_n \right) \eta \wedge \beta = \pi_*(\alpha) \wedge \beta.$$

Similarly, both sides are zero if α does not contain dt. The proof of 2. is similar. $\square$

== See also ==
- Transgression map
