= Artin–Schreier theory =

Branch of Galois theory in mathematics

In mathematics, Artin–Schreier theory is a branch of Galois theory, specifically a positive characteristic analogue of Kummer theory, for Galois extensions of degree equal to the characteristic p. Artin and Schreier (1927) introduced Artin–Schreier theory for extensions of prime degree p, and Witt (1936) generalized it to extensions of prime power degree p^{n}.

If K is a field of characteristic p, a prime number, any polynomial of the form

$$X^p - X - \alpha,\,$$

for $\alpha$ in K, is called an Artin–Schreier polynomial. When $\alpha\neq \beta^p-\beta$ for all $\beta \in K$, this polynomial is irreducible in K[X], and its splitting field over K is a cyclic extension of K of degree p. This follows since for any root β, the numbers β + i, for $1\le i\le p$, form all the roots—by Fermat's little theorem—so the splitting field is $K(\beta)$.

Conversely, any Galois extension of K of degree p equal to the characteristic of K is the splitting field of an Artin–Schreier polynomial. This can be proved using additive counterparts of the methods involved in Kummer theory, replacing Hilbert's theorem 90 by the Galois cohomology of the additive group. These extensions are called Artin–Schreier extensions.

Artin–Schreier extensions play a role in the theory of solvability by radicals, in characteristic p, representing one of the possible classes of extensions in a solvable chain.

They also play a part in the theory of abelian varieties and their isogenies. In characteristic p, an isogeny of degree p of abelian varieties must, for their function fields, give either an Artin–Schreier extension or a purely inseparable extension.

== Artin–Schreier–Witt extensions ==
There is an analogue of Artin–Schreier theory which describes cyclic extensions in characteristic p of p-power degree (not just degree p itself), using Witt vectors, developed by Witt (1936).
