= Semi-s-cobordism =

In mathematics, a cobordism (W, M, M^{−}) of an (n + 1)-dimensional manifold (with boundary) W between its boundary components, two n-manifolds M and M^{−}, is called a semi-s-cobordism if (and only if) the inclusion $M \hookrightarrow W$ is a simple homotopy equivalence (as in an s-cobordism), with no further requirement on the inclusion $M^- \hookrightarrow W$ (not even being a homotopy equivalence).

== Other notations ==
The original creator of this topic, Jean-Claude Hausmann, used the notation M_{−} for the right-hand boundary of the cobordism.

== Properties ==
A consequence of (W, M, M^{−}) being a semi-s-cobordism is that the kernel of the derived homomorphism on fundamental groups $K = \ker(\pi_1(M^{-}) \twoheadrightarrow \pi_1(W))$ is perfect. A corollary of this is that $\pi_1(M^{-})$ solves the group extension problem $1 \rightarrow K \rightarrow \pi_1(M^{-}) \rightarrow \pi_1(M) \rightarrow 1$. The solutions to the group extension problem for prescribed quotient group $\pi_1(M)$ and kernel group K are classified up to congruence by group cohomology (see Mac Lane's Homology pp. 124-129), so there are restrictions on which n-manifolds can be the right-hand boundary of a semi-s-cobordism with prescribed left-hand boundary M and superperfect kernel group K.

== Relationship with Plus cobordisms ==
Note that if (W, M, M^{−}) is a semi-s-cobordism, then (W, M^{−}, M) is a plus cobordism. (This justifies the use of M^{−} for the right-hand boundary of a semi-s-cobordism, a play on the traditional use of M^{+} for the right-hand boundary of a plus cobordism.) Thus, a semi-s-cobordism may be thought of as an inverse to Quillen's Plus construction in the manifold category. Note that (M^{−})^{+} must be diffeomorphic (respectively, piecewise-linearly (PL) homeomorphic) to M but there may be a variety of choices for (M^{+})^{−} for a given closed smooth (respectively, PL) manifold M.
