= Alfred H. Bill =

American novelist (1879–1964)

- Born: May 5, 1879; Rochester, New York
- Died: August 10, 1964 (aged 85); Princeton, New Jersey
- Occupation: Writer

Alfred Hoyt Bill (1879–1964) was an American writer. His non-fiction mostly dealt with American history while his fiction (some of it aimed at children) was set in different periods of British and French history.

He graduated with a bachelor's degree in 1903 from Yale University. After graduating, he was an instructor in English in the preparatory department of Seabury Divinity School in Faribault, Minnesota. In 1933, he and his wife moved to Princeton, New Jersey. The couple lived at 103 Mercer Street (on the same street as the Albert Einstein House). He wrote approximately 20 books on European and American history.

Upon his death in 1964, he was survived by his widow, the former Florence Dorothy Reid (1881–1967), their son Edward Clarke Bill (born in 1910) a daughter, and one grandchild. The first son of Alfred and Florence Bill was born in 1906 and survived for less than a year. Their daughter Florence (1907–1997) was married to Gregory Tschebotarioff.

== Bibliography ==
=== Fiction ===
- The Clutch of the Corsican: A Tale of the Days of Downfall of the Great Napoleon. Boston, Little, Brown, 1925, 241p.
- Highroads of Peril: Being the Adventures of Franklin Darlington, American, Among the Secret Agents of the Exiled Louis XVIII, King of France. Boston, Little, Brown and Company, 1926, 322p.
- Alas, Poor Yorick! Being Three Hitherto Unrecorded Adventures In the Life of the Reverend Laurence Sterne, A.B., Vicar of Coxwold In Yorkshire, Etc., Etc.. Boston, Little, Brown, and Co., 1927, 263p.
- The Red Prior's Legacy: The Story of the Adventures of an American Boy in the French Revolution. London, Longmans, Green, 1929, 256p.
- The Wolf In the Garden. New York, Longmans, Green, 1931, 287p. LCCN 31-25266; 2021 pbk edition. Wildside Press. January 2009. ISBN 978-1434479228; 145 pages, a werewolf thriller set in a village in New York state, soon after the end of the American Revolution
- The Ring of Danger, A Tale of Elizabethan England. New York, A.A. Knopf, 1948, 259p.

=== Non-fiction ===
- Astrophel; or, The Life and Death of the Renowned Sir Philip Sidney. New York, Toronto, Farrar & Rinehart, Inc., 1937, 372p. LCCN 37-21785
- The Beleaguered City: Richmond, 1861-1865, New York, Knopf, 1946, 313p. LCCN 45-10869
- Rehearsal for Conflict; the War with Mexico, 1846-1848. New York, A.A. Knopf, 1947, 342p. LCCN 47-31194
- The Campaign of Princeton, 1776-1777, Princeton, N.J., Princeton Univ. Press, 1948, 145p. LCCN 48-5265
  - 2015 pbk reprint of 1948 edition
- Valley Forge; the Making of an Army. New York, Harper, 1952, 259p. LCCN 52-5420
- A House called Morven, Its Role in American History, 1701-1954 (with Walter E. Edge). Princeton, N.J., Princeton University Press, 1954, 206p.
  - 1978 edition from Princeton University Press (ISBN 0-691-04641-7, 228p.) was revised by Constance M. Greiff.
  - 2015 pbk reprint of 1978 edition
- Horsemen, Blue and Gray: a Pictorial History (with James Ralph Johnson, illustrated by Hirst Dilon Milhollen). New York, Oxford University Press, 1960, 236p. LCCN 59-10461
- New Jersey and the Revolutionary War. Princeton, N.J., Van Nostrand, The New Jersey historical series, v. 11, 1964, 117p.
- "Fighting Bob": the Life and Exploits of Commodore Robert Field Stockton, United States Navy. Princeton, Princeton University Library, 1966.
