= Projection formula =

In algebraic geometry, the projection formula states the following:

For a morphism $f:X\to Y$ of ringed spaces, an $\mathcal{O}_X$-module $\mathcal{F}$ and a locally free $\mathcal{O}_Y$-module $\mathcal{E}$ of finite rank, the natural maps of sheaves

$$R^i f_* \mathcal{F} \otimes \mathcal{E} \to R^i f_* (\mathcal{F} \otimes f^* \mathcal{E})$$

are isomorphisms.

There is yet another projection formula in the setting of étale cohomology.

== See also ==
- Integration along fibers § Projection formula
