= Takagi existence theorem =

Correspondence between finite abelian extensions and generalized ideal class groups

In class field theory, the Takagi existence theorem states that for any number field K there is a one-to-one inclusion reversing correspondence between the finite abelian extensions of K (in a fixed algebraic closure of K) and the generalized ideal class groups defined via a modulus of K.

It is called an existence theorem because a main burden of the proof is to show the existence of enough abelian extensions of K.

== Formulation ==
Here a modulus (or ray divisor) is a formal finite product of the valuations (also called primes or places) of K with positive integer exponents. The archimedean valuations that might appear in a modulus include only those whose completions are the real numbers (not the complex numbers); they may be identified with orderings on K and occur only to exponent one.

The modulus m is a product of a non-archimedean (finite) part m_{f} and an archimedean (infinite) part m_{∞}. The non-archimedean part m_{f} is a nonzero ideal in the ring of integers O_{K} of K and the archimedean part m_{∞} is simply a set of real embeddings of K. Associated to such a modulus m are two groups of fractional ideals. The larger one, I_{m}, is the group of all fractional ideals relatively prime to m (which means these fractional ideals do not involve any prime ideal appearing in m_{f}). The smaller one, P_{m}, is the group of principal fractional ideals (u/v) where u and v are nonzero elements of O_{K} which are prime to m_{f}, u ≡ v mod m_{f}, and u/v > 0 in each of the orderings of m_{∞}. (It is important here that in P_{m}, all we require is that some generator of the ideal has the indicated form. If one does, others might not. For instance, taking K to be the rational numbers, the ideal (3) lies in P_{4} because (3) = (−3) and −3 fits the necessary conditions. But (3) is not in P_{4∞} since here it is required that the positive generator of the ideal is 1 mod 4, which is not so.) For any group H lying between I_{m} and P_{m}, the quotient I_{m}/H is called a generalized ideal class group.

It is these generalized ideal class groups which correspond to abelian extensions of K by the existence theorem, and in fact are the Galois groups of these extensions. That generalized ideal class groups are finite is proved along the same lines of the proof that the usual ideal class group is finite, well in advance of knowing these are Galois groups of finite abelian extensions of the number field.

== A well-defined correspondence ==
Strictly speaking, the correspondence between finite abelian extensions of K and generalized ideal class groups is not quite one-to-one. Generalized ideal class groups defined relative to different moduli can give rise to the same abelian extension of K, and this is codified a priori in a somewhat complicated equivalence relation on generalized ideal class groups.

In concrete terms, for abelian extensions L of the rational numbers, this corresponds to the fact that an abelian extension of the rationals lying in one cyclotomic field also lies in infinitely many other cyclotomic fields, and for each such cyclotomic overfield one obtains by Galois theory a subgroup of the Galois group corresponding to the same field L.

In the idelic formulation of class field theory, one obtains a precise one-to-one correspondence between abelian extensions and appropriate groups of ideles, where equivalent generalized ideal class groups in the ideal-theoretic language correspond to the same group of ideles.

== Earlier work ==
A special case of the existence theorem is when m = 1 and H = P_{1}. In this case the generalized ideal class group is the ideal class group of K, and the existence theorem says there exists a unique abelian extension L/K with Galois group isomorphic to the ideal class group of K such that L is unramified at all places of K. This extension is called the Hilbert class field. It was conjectured by David Hilbert to exist, and existence in this special case was proved by Philipp Furtwängler in 1907, before Takagi's general existence theorem.

A further and special property of the Hilbert class field, not true of smaller abelian extensions of a number field, is that all ideals in a number field become principal in the Hilbert class field. It required Artin and Furtwängler to prove that principalization occurs.

== History ==
The existence theorem is due to Takagi, who proved it in Japan during the isolated years of World War I. He presented it at the International Congress of Mathematicians in 1920, leading to the development of the classical theory of class field theory during the 1920s. At Hilbert's request, the paper was published in Mathematische Annalen in 1925.

== See also ==
- Class formation
