= Valentina Chebotaryova =

Russian nurse (d. 1919)

Valentina Ivanovna Chebotaryova
- Died: May 6, 1919; Russia
- Occupation: Red Cross nurse
- Spouse: Porphyry Grigoievich Chebotarev
- Parent(s): Ivan Stepanovich Doubiagsky, father; Olga Segeyevna, mother.

Valentina Ivanovna Chebotaryova (birth date unknown - April 23 (O.S.)/May 6 (N.S.), 1919) recorded her impressions of work in a military hospital in Tsarskoye Selo, Russia during World War I in her journal. Portions of the journal, which included her impressions of Tsarina Alexandra and of her daughters Grand Duchess Olga Nikolaevna of Russia and Grand Duchess Tatiana Nikolaevna of Russia were published in magazines, books, and in her son's memoirs after the war.

== Life ==
Chebotaryova was the daughter of Ivan Stepanovich Dubyagsky and his wife Olga Sergeyevna. She married Porphiry Grigoryevich Chebotaryov and had two children, Grigory and Valentina. Chebotaryova had earlier volunteered as a nurse during the Russo-Japanese War of 1904-1905 and had taken formal nursing courses at the time. Despite the fact that she did not move in the highest society circles, she was asked to join a group of women who nursed soldiers along with the Tsarina and her daughters at a Palace Hospital at Tsarskoye Selo.

== Association with the Romanovs ==
Chebotaryova grew fond of the grand duchesses and had personal sympathy for the Tsarina, but also blamed Alexandra and her reliance on Grigori Rasputin for the political upheaval that followed. Chebotareva exchanged letters with the grand duchesses and the Tsarina while they were imprisoned at Tsarskoye Selo following the October Revolution. Alexandra felt hurt that Chebotaryova and her fellow nurses did not write to her directly while she was imprisoned at Tobolsk. "I greatly regret that I was unable to kiss Tatiana and take leave of her personally -- but kindness from (Alexandra Feodorovna) I find difficult to bear," Chebotaryova wrote in her journal on August 10, 1917. "I feel terribly sorry for her and yet it is all so painful that I cannot find the warm feelings of old, after all she is the awful cause of all the misfortunes of our land, she ruined her entire family, the unfortunate -- sick of soul, sick with mysticism and arrogant pride ..."

== Death ==
Chebotaryova continued her volunteer hospital work under the new administration, but caught typhus and died in April 1919. Her son, Grigory, was given a ribbon by her fellow nurses that read "From the Trustees and the Army Hospitals to the unforgettable V.I. Chebotareva who gave her life 'for her friends' "

== Sources ==
- Tschebotarioff, Gregory P., Russia: My Native Land: A U.S. engineer reminisces and looks at the present, McGraw-Hill Book Company, 1964, ASIN B00005XTZJ
