= Gregory Tschebotarioff =

- Born: February 28, 1899; Pavlovsk, Russia
- Died: April 22, 1985 (aged 86); Holland, Pennsylvania, U.S.
- Education: Technische Hochschule Berlin
- Spouse: Florence Dorothy Bill (m. 1939)
- Mother: Valentina Ivanovna Chebotareva

Gregory P. Tschebotarioff, (February 28, 1899 – April 22, 1985), was a Russian-born civil engineer and prolific author. His memoir Russia, My Native Land recounted his experiences as a boy and young man in Russia, where he served in the military during World War I.

== Biography ==
Tschebotarioff was born in Pavlovsk, Russia, the son of Porphyry Grigorievich Chebotarev (1873–1920), an officer of the Don Cossack Guard Battery stationed at Pavlovsk, and his wife Valentina Ivanovna, the daughter of a former Army doctor. His mother, Valentina Ivanovna Chebotareva, served as a Red Cross nurse at a hospital in Tsarskoye Selo, Russia with Tsarina Alexandra. Tschebotarioff published his mother's wartime journal in Russia, My Native Land and in other publications.

When he became an American citizen in 1941, he retained the German spelling of his last name.

He studied in Imperial School of Jurisprudence and volunteered to Mikhailovskaya artillery school, completing its shortened wartime course in December 1916. He served at the front of World War I with the Don cossack artillery battery in 1917.

Following the Russian Revolution of 1917 and his parents' deaths a few years apart from typhus, Tschebotarioff was left responsible for his younger sister Valentina. He eventually arranged for the young girl to be cared for by her godmother, Baroness Sophie von Medem, in Germany. He completed his studies to become an engineer at Technische Hochschule Berlin (now Technische Universität Berlin).

Later he worked as an engineer in Cairo, Egypt for seven years. In 1937 he obtained a position at Princeton University in New Jersey. He eventually became a full professor of civil engineering at Princeton. In 1955 he became an associate of King & Gavaris, a New York civil engineering consulting firm.

Tschebotarioff was the author of a number of books and scientific journal articles in his field.

He married Florence Dorothy Bill, the daughter of historian Alfred H. Bill, in 1939. His sister Valentina married one of Florence's brothers.

Tschebotarioff died on April 22, 1985 in Holland, Pennsylvania.
