= Inflation-restriction exact sequence =

In mathematics, the inflation-restriction exact sequence is an exact sequence occurring in group cohomology and is a special case of the five-term exact sequence arising from the study of spectral sequences.

Specifically, let G be a group, N a normal subgroup, and A an abelian group which is equipped with an action of G, i.e., a homomorphism from G to the automorphism group of A. The quotient group G/N acts on

A^{N} = { a ∈ A : na = a for all n ∈ N}.

Then the inflation-restriction exact sequence is:

0 → H^{1}(G/N, A^{N}) → H^{1}(G, A) → H^{1}(N, A)^{G/N} → H^{2}(G/N, A^{N}) →H^{2}(G, A)

In this sequence, there are maps

- inflation H^{1}(G/N, A^{N}) → H^{1}(G, A)
- restriction H^{1}(G, A) → H^{1}(N, A)^{G/N}
- transgression H^{1}(N, A)^{G/N} → H^{2}(G/N, A^{N})
- inflation H^{2}(G/N, A^{N}) →H^{2}(G, A)

The inflation and restriction are defined for general n:

- inflation H^{n}(G/N, A^{N}) → H^{n}(G, A)
- restriction H^{n}(G, A) → H^{n}(N, A)^{G/N}

The transgression is defined for general n

- transgression H^{n}(N, A)^{G/N} → H^{n+1}(G/N, A^{N})

only if H^{i}(N, A)^{G/N} = 0 for i ≤ n − 1.

The sequence for general n may be deduced from the case n = 1 by dimension-shifting or from the Lyndon–Hochschild–Serre spectral sequence.
