= Kummer theory =

Theory in abstract algebra

In abstract algebra and number theory, Kummer theory provides a description of certain types of field extensions involving the adjunction of nth roots of elements of the base field. The theory was originally developed by Ernst Eduard Kummer around the 1840s in his pioneering work on Fermat's Last Theorem. The main statements do not depend on the nature of the field – apart from its characteristic, which should not divide the integer n – and therefore belong to abstract algebra. The theory of cyclic extensions of the field K when the characteristic of K does divide n is called Artin–Schreier theory.

Kummer theory is basic, for example, in class field theory and in general in understanding abelian extensions; it says that in the presence of enough roots of unity, cyclic extensions can be understood in terms of extracting roots. The main burden in class field theory is to dispense with extra roots of unity ('descending' back to smaller fields); which is something much more serious.

== Kummer extensions ==
A Kummer extension is a field extension L/K, where for some given integer n > 1 we have

- K contains n distinct nth roots of unity (i.e., roots of X^{n} − 1)
- L/K has abelian Galois group of exponent n.

For example, when n = 2, the first condition is always true if K has characteristic ≠ 2. The Kummer extensions in this case include quadratic extensions $L= K(\sqrt{a})$ where a in K is a non-square element. By the usual solution of quadratic equations, any extension of degree 2 of K has this form. The Kummer extensions in this case also include biquadratic extensions and more general multiquadratic extensions. When K has characteristic 2, there are no such Kummer extensions.

Taking n = 3, there are no degree 3 Kummer extensions of the rational number field Q, since for three cube roots of 1 complex numbers are required. If one takes L to be the splitting field of X^{3} − a over Q, where a is not a cube in the rational numbers, then L contains a subfield K with three cube roots of 1; that is because if α and β are roots of the cubic polynomial, we shall have (α/β)^{3} =1 and the cubic is a separable polynomial. Then L/K is a Kummer extension.

More generally, it is true that when K contains n distinct nth roots of unity, which implies that the characteristic of K doesn't divide n, then adjoining to K the nth root of any element a of K creates a Kummer extension (of degree m, for some m dividing n). As the splitting field of the polynomial X^{n} − a, the Kummer extension is necessarily Galois, with Galois group that is cyclic of order m. It is easy to track the Galois action via the root of unity in front of $\sqrt[n]{a}.$

Kummer theory provides converse statements. When K contains n distinct nth roots of unity, it states that any abelian extension of K of exponent dividing n is formed by extraction of roots of elements of K. Further, if K^{×} denotes the multiplicative group of non-zero elements of K, abelian extensions of K of exponent n correspond bijectively with subgroups of

$$K^{\times}/(K^{\times})^n,$$

that is, elements of K^{×} modulo nth powers. The correspondence can be described explicitly as follows. Given a subgroup

$$\Delta \subseteq K^{\times}/(K^{\times})^n,$$

the corresponding extension is given by

$$K \left (\Delta^{\frac{1}{n}} \right),$$

where

$$\Delta^{\frac{1}{n}} = \left \{ \sqrt[n]{a}:a\in K^{\times}, a \cdot \left (K^{\times} \right )^n \in \Delta \right \}.$$

In fact it suffices to adjoin nth root of one representative of each element of any set of generators of the group Δ. Conversely, if L is a Kummer extension of K, then Δ is recovered by the rule

$$\Delta = \left (K^\times \cap (L^\times)^n \right )/(K^{\times})^n.$$

In this case there is an isomorphism

$$\Delta \cong \operatorname{Hom}_{\text{c}}(\operatorname{Gal}(L/K), \mu_n)$$

given by

$$a \mapsto \left(\sigma \mapsto \frac{\sigma(\alpha)}{\alpha}\right),$$

where α is any nth root of a in L. Here $\mu_n$ denotes the multiplicative group of nth roots of unity (which belong to K) and $\operatorname{Hom}_{\text{c}}(\operatorname{Gal}(L/K), \mu_n)$ is the group of continuous homomorphisms from $\operatorname{Gal}(L/K)$ equipped with Krull topology to $\mu_n$ with discrete topology (with group operation given by pointwise multiplication). This group (with discrete topology) can also be viewed as Pontryagin dual of $\operatorname{Gal}(L/K)$, assuming we regard $\mu_n$ as a subgroup of circle group. If the extension L/K is finite, then $\operatorname{Gal}(L/K)$ is a finite discrete group and we have

$$\Delta \cong \operatorname{Hom}(\operatorname{Gal}(L/K), \mu_n) \cong \operatorname{Gal}(L/K),$$

however the last isomorphism isn't natural.

=== Recovering a^{1/n} from a primitive element ===
For $p$ prime, let $K$ be a field containing $\zeta_p$ and $K(\beta)/K$ a degree $p$ Galois extension. Note the Galois group is cyclic, generated by $\sigma$. Let

$$\alpha= \sum_{l=0}^{p-1} \zeta_p^{l} \sigma^l(\beta) \in K(\beta)$$

If we choose $\beta$ appropriately (for example, if $\{\sigma^i(\beta)\}_{i=0}^{p-1}$ is a Normal basis), then $\alpha\neq 0$ and

$$\zeta_p \sigma(\alpha) = \sum_{l=0}^{p-1} \zeta_p^{l+1} \sigma^{l+1}(\beta) = \alpha.$$

Hence $\alpha\ne \sigma(\alpha)$, so $K(\alpha) = K(\beta)$ and

$$\alpha^p = \pm \prod_{l=0}^{p-1} \zeta_p^{-l} \alpha = \pm \prod_{l=0}^{p-1} \sigma^l(\alpha) = \pm N_{K(\beta)/K}(\alpha) \in K$$,

where the $\pm$ sign is $+$ if $p$ is odd and $-$ if $p=2$.

When $L/K$ is an abelian extension of degree $n= \prod_{j=1}^m p_j$ square-free such that $\zeta_n \in K$, apply the same argument to the subfields $K(\beta_j)/K$ Galois of degree $p_j$ to obtain

$$L = K \left (a_1^{1/p_1},\ldots,a_m^{1/p_m} \right ) = K \left (A^{1/p_1},\ldots,A^{1/p_m} \right )= K \left (A^{1/n} \right )$$

where

$$A = \prod_{j=1}^m a_j^{n/p_j} \in K$$.

== Kummer map ==
One of the main tools in Kummer theory is the Kummer map. Let $m$ be a positive integer and let $K$ be a field, not necessarily containing the $m$th roots of unity. Letting $\overline{K}$ denote the algebraic closure of $K$, there is a short exact sequence

$0\xrightarrow{} \overline{K}^{\times}[m] \xrightarrow{} \overline{K}^{\times} \xrightarrow{z\mapsto z^m} \overline{K}^{\times}\xrightarrow{} 0$

Choosing an extension $L/K$ and taking $\mathrm{Gal}(\overline{K}/L)$-cohomology one obtains the sequence

$0\xrightarrow{} L^{\times}/(L^{\times})^{m} \xrightarrow{} H^1\left(L, \overline{K}^{\times}[m]\right) \xrightarrow{} H^1\left(L,\overline{K}^{\times}\right)[m]\xrightarrow{}0$

By Hilbert's Theorem 90 $H^1\left(L,\overline{K}^{\times}\right)=0$, and hence we get an isomorphism $\delta: L^{\times}/\left(L^{\times}\right)^m\xrightarrow{\sim}H^1\left(L,\overline{K}^{\times}[m]\right)$. This is the Kummer map. A version of this map also exists when all $m$ are considered simultaneously. Namely, since $L^{\times}/(L^{\times})^m=L^{\times}\otimes m^{-1} \mathbb{Z}/\mathbb{Z}$, taking the direct limit over $m$ yields an isomorphism

$\delta: L^{\times} \otimes \mathbb{Q}/\mathbb{Z} \xrightarrow{\sim} H^1\left(L, \overline{K}_{tors}\right)$,

where tors denotes the torsion subgroup of roots of unity.

== For elliptic curves ==
Kummer theory is often used in the context of elliptic curves. Let $E/K$ be an elliptic curve. There is a short exact sequence

$0\xrightarrow{} E[m]\xrightarrow{} E \xrightarrow{P\mapsto m\cdot P} E \xrightarrow{} 0$,

where the multiplication by $m$ map is surjective since $E$ is divisible. Choosing an algebraic extension $L/K$ and taking cohomology, we obtain the Kummer sequence for $E$:

$0\xrightarrow{} E(L)/mE(L)\xrightarrow{} H^1(L, E[m])\xrightarrow{} H^1(L,E)[m]\xrightarrow{}0$.

The computation of the weak Mordell-Weil group $E(L)/mE(L)$ is a key part of the proof of the Mordell-Weil theorem. The failure of $H^1(L,E)$ to vanish adds a key complexity to the theory.

== Generalizations ==
Suppose that G is a profinite group acting on a module A with a surjective homomorphism π from the G-module A to itself. Suppose also that G acts trivially on the kernel C of π and that the first cohomology group H^{1}(G,A) is trivial. Then the exact sequence of group cohomology shows that there is an isomorphism between A^{G}/π(A^{G}) and Hom(G,C).

Kummer theory is the special case of this when A is the multiplicative group of the separable closure of a field k, G is the Galois group, π is the nth power map, and C the group of nth roots of unity. Artin–Schreier theory is the special case when A is the additive group of the separable closure of a field k of positive characteristic p, G is the Galois group, π is the Frobenius map minus the identity, and C the finite field of order p. Taking A to be the additive group of a ring of truncated Witt vectors gives Witt's generalization of Artin–Schreier theory to extensions of exponent dividing p^{n}.

== See also ==
- Quadratic field
