= Hilbert's Theorem 90 =

Result due to Kummer on cyclic extensions of fields that leads to Kummer theory

In abstract algebra, Hilbert's Theorem 90 (or Satz 90) is an important result on cyclic extensions of fields (or to one of its generalizations) that leads to Kummer theory. In its most basic form, it states that if L/K is an extension of fields with cyclic Galois group G = Gal(L/K) generated by an element $\sigma,$ and if $a$ is an element of L of relative norm 1, that is

$N(a):=a\, \sigma(a)\, \sigma^2(a)\cdots \sigma^{n-1}(a)=1,$

then there exists $b$ in L such that

$a=b/\sigma(b).$

The theorem takes its name from the fact that it is the 90th theorem in David Hilbert's Zahlbericht (Hilbert 1897, 1998), although it is originally due to Kummer (1855, p.213, 1861).

Often a more general theorem due to Emmy Noether (1933) is given the name, stating that if L/K is a finite Galois extension of fields with arbitrary Galois group G = Gal(L/K), then the first cohomology group of G, with coefficients in the multiplicative group of L, is trivial:

$$H^1(G,L^\times)=\{1\}.$$

== Examples ==
Let $L/K$ be the quadratic extension $\Q(i)/\Q$. The Galois group is cyclic of order 2, its generator $\sigma$ acting via conjugation:

$$\sigma: c + di\mapsto c - di.$$

An element $a=x+yi$ in $\Q(i)$ has norm $a\sigma(a)=x^2+y^2$. An element of norm one thus corresponds to a rational solution of the equation $x^2+y^2=1$ or in other words, a point with rational coordinates on the unit circle. Hilbert's Theorem 90 then states that every such element a of norm one can be written as

$$a=\frac{c-di}{c+di}=\frac{c^2-d^2}{c^2+d^2} - \frac{2cd}{c^2+d^2} i,$$

where $b = c+di$ is as in the conclusion of the theorem, and c and d are both integers. This may be viewed as a rational parametrization of the rational points on the unit circle. Rational points $(x,y)=(p/r,q/r)$ on the unit circle $x^2+y^2=1$ correspond to Pythagorean triples, i.e. triples $(p,q,r)$ of integers satisfying $p^2+q^2=r^2$.

== Cohomology ==
The theorem can be stated in terms of group cohomology: if L^{×} is the multiplicative group of any (not necessarily finite) Galois extension L of a field K with corresponding Galois group G, then

$$H^1(G,L^\times)=\{1\}.$$

Specifically, group cohomology is the cohomology of the complex whose i-cochains are arbitrary functions from i-tuples of group elements to the multiplicative coefficient group, $C^i(G,L^\times) = \{\phi:G^i\to L^\times\}$, with differentials $d^i : C^i\to C^{i+1}$ defined in dimensions $i = 0,1$ by:

$(d^0(b))(\sigma) = b / b^\sigma, \quad \text{ and } \quad (d^1(\phi))(\sigma,\tau) \,=\,\phi(\sigma) \phi(\tau)^\sigma / \phi(\sigma\tau) ,$

where $x^g$ denotes the image of the $G$-module element $x$ under the action of the group element $g \in G$. Note that in the first of these we have identified a 0-cochain $\gamma = \gamma_b : G^0 = id_G \to L^\times$, with its unique image value $b \in L^\times$. The triviality of the first cohomology group is then equivalent to the 1-cocycles $Z^1$ being equal to the 1-coboundaries $B^1$, viz.:

$\begin{array}{rcl} Z^1 &=& \ker d^1 &=& \{\phi\in C^1\text{ satisfying }\,\,\forall \sigma , \tau \in G \, \colon\,\, \phi(\sigma\tau) = \phi(\sigma)\,\phi(\tau)^\sigma \} \\ \text{ is equal to }\\ B^1 &=& \text{im } d^0 &=& \{\phi\in C^1\ \, \colon \,\, \exists\, b\in L^\times \text{ such that } \phi(\sigma)=b / b^\sigma \ \ \forall \sigma \in G \}. \end{array}$

For cyclic $G =\{1,\sigma,\ldots,\sigma^{n-1}\}$, a 1-cocycle is determined by $\phi(\sigma)=a\in L^\times$, with $\phi(\sigma^i) = a\,\sigma(a)\cdots\sigma^{i-1}(a)$ and:

$1=\phi(1)=\phi(\sigma^n)=a\,\sigma(a)\cdots\sigma^{n-1}(a)=N(a).$

On the other hand, a 1-coboundary is determined by $\phi(\sigma)=b / b^\sigma$. Equating these gives the original version of the Theorem.

A further generalization is to cohomology with non-abelian coefficients: that if H is either the general or special linear group over L, including $\operatorname{GL}_1(L)=L^\times$, then

$H^1(G,H)=\{1\}.$

Another generalization is to a scheme X:

$$H^1_{\text{et}}(X,\mathbb{G}_m) = H^1(X,\mathcal{O}_X^\times) = \operatorname{Pic}(X),$$

where $\operatorname{Pic}(X)$ is the group of isomorphism classes of locally free sheaves of $\mathcal{O}_X^\times$-modules of rank 1 for the Zariski topology, and $\mathbb{G}_m$ is the sheaf defined by the affine line without the origin considered as a group under multiplication.

There is yet another generalization to Milnor K-theory which plays a role in Voevodsky's proof of the Milnor conjecture.

== Proof ==
Let $L/K$ be cyclic of degree $n,$ and $\sigma$ generate $\operatorname{Gal}(L/K)$. Pick any $a\in L$ of norm

$$N(a):=a \sigma(a) \sigma^2(a)\cdots \sigma^{n-1}(a)=1.$$

By clearing denominators, solving $a=x/\sigma^{-1}(x) \in L$ is the same as showing that $a\sigma^{-1}(\cdot) : L \to L$ has $1$ as an eigenvalue. We extend this to a map of $L$-vector spaces via

$$\begin{cases} 1_L\otimes a\sigma^{-1}(\cdot) : L\otimes_KL \to L\otimes_K L \\ \ell \otimes\ell'\mapsto \ell\otimes a\sigma^{-1}(\ell').\end{cases}$$

The primitive element theorem gives $L=K(\alpha)$ for some $\alpha$. Since $\alpha$ has minimal polynomial

$$f(t)=(t-\alpha)(t-\sigma(\alpha))\cdots \left (t-\sigma^{n-1}(\alpha) \right ) \in K[t],$$

we can identify

$$L\otimes_KL\stackrel{\sim}{\to} L\otimes_K K[t] /f(t) \stackrel{\sim}{\to} L[t]/f(t) \stackrel{\sim}{\to} L^{n}$$

via

$$\ell\otimes p(\alpha) \mapsto \ell \left (p(\alpha), p(\sigma \alpha ),\ldots , p(\sigma^{n-1} \alpha ) \right ).$$

Here we wrote the second factor as a $K$-polynomial in $\alpha$.

Under this identification, our map becomes

$$\begin{cases} a\sigma^{-1}(\cdot) : L^n\to L^n \\ \ell \left(p(\alpha),\ldots, p(\sigma^{n-1}\alpha)) \mapsto \ell(ap(\sigma^{n-1}\alpha), \sigma a p(\alpha), \ldots, \sigma^{n-1} a p(\sigma^{n-2}\alpha) \right ). \end{cases}$$

That is to say under this map

$$(\ell_1, \ldots ,\ell_n)\mapsto (a \ell_n, \sigma a \ell_1, \ldots, \sigma^{n-1} a  \ell_{n-1}).$$

$(1, \sigma a, \sigma a \sigma^2 a, \ldots, \sigma a \cdots \sigma^{n-1}a)$ is an eigenvector with eigenvalue $1$ iff $a$ has norm $1$.
