= Plus construction =

In mathematics, the plus construction is a method for simplifying the fundamental group of a space without changing its homology and cohomology groups.

Explicitly, if $X$ is a based connected CW complex and $P$ is a perfect normal subgroup of $\pi_1(X)$ then a map $f\colon X \to Y$ is called a +-construction relative to $P$ if $f$ induces an isomorphism on homology, and $P$ is the kernel of $\pi_1(X) \to \pi_1(Y)$.

The plus construction was introduced by Michel Kervaire (1969), and was used by Daniel Quillen to define algebraic K-theory. Given a perfect normal subgroup of the fundamental group of a connected CW complex $X$, attach two-cells along loops in $X$ whose images in the fundamental group generate the subgroup. This operation generally changes the homology of the space, but these changes can be reversed by the addition of three-cells.

The most common application of the plus construction is in algebraic K-theory. If $R$ is a unital ring, we denote by $\operatorname{GL}_n(R)$ the group of invertible $n$-by-$n$ matrices with elements in $R$. $\operatorname{GL}_n(R)$ embeds in $\operatorname{GL}_{n+1}(R)$ by attaching a $1$ along the diagonal and $0$s elsewhere. The direct limit of these groups via these maps is denoted $\operatorname{GL}(R)$ and its classifying space is denoted $B\operatorname{GL}(R)$. The plus construction may then be applied to the perfect normal subgroup $E(R)$ of $\operatorname{GL}(R) = \pi_1(B\operatorname{GL}(R))$, generated by matrices which only differ from the identity matrix in one off-diagonal entry. For $n>0$, the $n$-th homotopy group of the resulting space, $B\operatorname{GL}(R)^+$, is isomorphic to the $n$-th $K$-group of $R$, that is,

$$\pi_n\left( B\operatorname{GL}(R)^+\right) \cong K_n(R).$$

== See also ==
- Semi-s-cobordism
