= G-module =

Algebraic structure

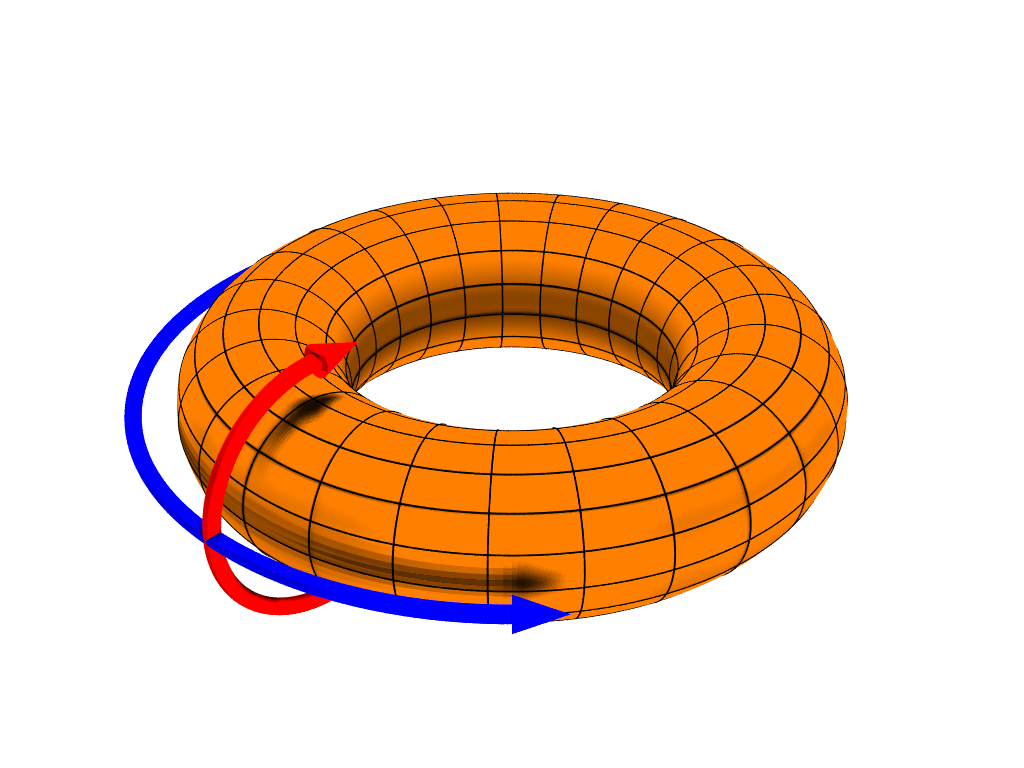
The torus can be made an abelian group isomorphic to the product of the circle group. This abelian group is a Klein four-group-module, where the group acts by reflection in each of the coordinate directions (here depicted by red and blue arrows intersecting at the identity element).

In mathematics, given a group $G$, a G-module is an abelian group $M$ on which $G$ acts compatibly with the abelian group structure on $M$. This widely applicable notion generalizes that of a representation of G. Group (co)homology provides an important set of tools for studying general $G$-modules.

The term G-module is also used for the more general notion of an R-module on which $G$ acts linearly (i.e. as a group of $R$-module automorphisms).

== Definition and basics ==
Let $G$ be a group. A left $G$-module consists of an abelian group $M$ together with a left group action $\rho:G\times M\to M$ such that

$$g\cdot(a_1+a_2)=g\cdot a_1+g\cdot a_2$$

for all $a_1$ and $a_2$ in $M$ and all $g$ in $G$, where $g\cdot a$ denotes $\rho(g,a)$. A right $G$-module is defined similarly. Given a left $G$-module $M$, it can be turned into a right $G$-module by defining $a\cdot g=g^{-1}\cdot a$.

A function $f:M\rightarrow N$ is called a morphism of $G$-modules (or a $G$-linear map, or a $G$-homomorphism) if $f$ is both a group homomorphism and $G$-equivariant.

The collection of left (respectively right) $G$-modules and their morphisms form an abelian category $G\textbf{-Mod}$ (resp. $\textbf{Mod-}G$). The category $G\text{-Mod}$ (resp. $\text{Mod-}G$) can be identified with the category of left (resp. right) $\mathbb{Z}G$-modules, i.e. with the modules over the group ring $\mathbb{Z}[G]$.

A submodule of a $G$-module $M$ is a subgroup $A\subseteq M$ that is stable under the action of $G$, i.e. $g\cdot a\in A$ for all $g\in G$ and $a\in A$. Given a submodule $A$ of $M$, the quotient module $M/A$ is the quotient group with action $g\cdot (m+A)=g\cdot m+A$.

== Examples ==
- Given a group $G$, the abelian group $\mathbb{Z}$ is a $G$-module with the trivial action $g\cdot a=a$.
- Let $M$ be the set of binary quadratic forms $f(x,y)=ax^2+2bxy+cy^2$ with $a,b,c$ integers, and let $G=\text{SL}(2,\mathbb{Z})$ (the 2×2 special linear group over $\mathbb{Z}$). Define

$$(g\cdot f)(x,y)=f((x,y)g^t)=f\left((x,y)\cdot\begin{bmatrix}
\alpha & \gamma \\
\beta & \delta
\end{bmatrix}\right)=f(\alpha x+\beta y,\gamma x+\delta y),$$

where

$$g=\begin{bmatrix}
\alpha & \beta \\
\gamma & \delta
\end{bmatrix}$$

and $(x,y)g$ is matrix multiplication. Then $M$ is a $G$-module studied by Gauss. Indeed, we have

$$g(h(f(x,y))) = gf((x,y)h^t)=f((x,y)h^tg^t)=f((x,y)(gh)^t)=(gh)f(x,y).$$

- If $V$ is a representation of $G$ over a field $K$, then $V$ is a $G$-module (it is an abelian group under addition).

== Topological groups ==
If $G$ is a topological group and $M$ is an abelian topological group, then a topological G-module is a $G$-module where the action map $G\times M\rightarrow M$ is continuous (where the product topology is taken on $G\times M$).

In other words, a topological $G$-module is an abelian topological group $M$ together with a continuous map $G\times M\rightarrow M$ satisfying the usual relations $g(a+a')=ga+ga'$, $(gg')a=g(g'a)$, and $1a=a$.
