= Luftnachrichten Abteilung 350 =

World War II signals intelligence agency of the German Luftwaffe

The Luftnachrichten Abteilung 350, abbreviated as OKL/Ln Abt 350 and formerly called the (German: Oberkommando der Luftwaffe Luftnachrichtenabteilung 350), was the Signal Intelligence Agency of the German Air Force, the Luftwaffe, before and during World War II. Before November 1944, the unit was the German: Chiffrierstelle, Oberbefehlshaber der Luftwaffe, lit. 'code centre, High Commander of the Air Force', which was often abbreviated to Chi-Stelle/ObdL or more commonly Chi-Stelle.

The founding of the former agencies of OKL/Ln Abt 350 dates back to the year 1936, when Colonel (later General der Luftnachrichtentruppe) Wolfgang Martini instigated the creation of the agency, that was later established on the orders of Hermann Göring, the German politician, head of the air force, and leading member of the Nazi Party. Right from the beginning, the Luftwaffe High Command resolved to make itself entirely independent from the German Army (Heer) in the field of cryptology.

== Background ==
The LN Abt 350 was one of a large number of regiments which were named in that series, but there were several related regiments, which dealt with intelligence-related matters, of one kind or another. These were as follows:

- LN Regiment 351. Mapping and interception of communications intelligence of Allied air forces in England and France. It conducted air to air interception, ground to air, and ground to ground including tracking of navigational aids.
- LN Regiment 352. Mapping and interception of communication intelligence of Allied air forces in the Mediterranean area.
- LN Regiment 353. Tracking and mapping of the Soviet Air Force.
- LN Abteilung 355. Allied air forces in northern areas, specifically the Soviet Air Force in Northern Norway. It covered ground to ground, and air to air according to reception conditions. This unit was formerly W-Leit 5 based in Oslo.
- LN Abteilung 356. Route tracking of Allied air forces by radar interception and in collaboration with LN Regiment 357.
- LN Abteilung 357. Tracking Allied four-engined formations and route tracking by intercepted signals and in collaboration with LN Abt. 356.
- LN Abteilung 358. Training of intercept personnel.
- LN Abteilung 359. radio jamming of Allied communications, but it also conducted deception operations.

== Chi-Stelle ==
Organization chart with a legend for Luftwaffe Signals Organization.

== History of operations in the west ==
=== Outbreak of the war ===
Fixed signals stations in the Reichswehr

Luftwaffe signals intelligence operations at the start of World War II

This diagram details the geographical layout of Luftwaffe signals intercept stations in the west of Europe during the middle of 1941.

Luftwaffe signals organisation in Norway in the middle of 1942

==== General ====
The effect of the outbreak of war was immediately felt by Chi-Stelle, in so far as all participating nations began to transmit the majority of their messages in codes and cyphers. Thus the evaluation of the contents of messages was made more difficult, although the organisation of Allied air forces, as such, that were already known, could be built up from intelligence on hand. Newly activated units were identified on the basis of existing tables of organisation. In the early months of the war in France only the movements of bomber and reconnaissance units could be determined since the fighter arm could only be followed by monitoring RT traffic.

The Invasion of Poland only lasted 18 days and was over too quickly for signals intelligence to play a part in it. However the Invasion of France and Invasion of Russia were preceded by a long preparatory period in which the respective Leitstelle found time to familiarise themselves with Allied procedure. Also by virtue of existing reserves, it was possible to concentrate the bulk of available resources on a single opponent.

==== Organisation ====
With the outbreak of the war only two battalions were established for use in the west: W-Leit 2 and W-Leit 3 and these were immediately committed. Both battalions had substantial difficulties to contend with, e.g. the shortage of officers was so acute that two intercept companies had to be commanded jointly by one officer. The position of the Leitstellen at Luftflotte Headquarters was a difficult one. Contributory factors was the complete unfamiliarity of the Leitstellen commanders with Signal Intelligence processes that included the strict security of own processes that the Chi-Stelle operated on. Even the flying units of the Luftflotten that were interested only in combat, regarded signal intelligence with much scepticism. The first break in this wall of distrust was achieved through the results of monitoring Allied RT fighter traffic.

In order to combat raids by French fighter aircraft on Germany. Individual intercept detachments were formed from the companies under W-Leit 3 to intercept the fighters RT traffic. On their own initiative these detachments sought contact with German fighter units, to whom they communicated their observations by telephone. As the French fighter pilots talked excessively while flying, a great deal of valuable information was provided to traffic intercepts captured by German fighter control, especially since the detachments were equipped with Direction finding (DF) equipment that could pinpoint French fighters. The successes of Staffel and Gruppen working together with signals detachments in shooting down Allied aircraft to such an extent that Chi-Stelle became an esteemed agency whose intelligence was valued by the German Fighter Command.

The British night attacks on Germany began in the first months of 1940. Usually the British bombers flew to Le Bourget during the afternoon, and then took off from there at night, flying as far as the Prague area. Their route was followed closely by intercept stations W-Leit 2 and W-Leit 3 through taking DF bearings on air-to-air traffic and from pilots, speaking freely. They flights were for propaganda and training purposes, during which leaflets were dropped.

Neither in the six-weeks long Battle of France was it possible for Chi-Stelle or signals to distinguish themselves, owing to the speedy sequence of events. An exception was the intercept detachments of the 9th and 10th Companies under W-Leit 3 that worked in cooperation with German fighter units. At the end of the Battle of France, W-Leit 3 moved to La Celle-Saint-Cloud, the 9th Company to Deauville, the 10th to Saint-Malo, W-23 to Brest and W-33 to La Celle-Saint-Cloud. W-Leit 2 had already moved during the campaign with W-12 to the vicinity of Brussels and from there dispatched an intercept platoon to Wissant. The platoon covered No. 11 Group RAF in England. At times the large scale operations of the German Luftwaffe against England in autumn 1940 were directed from its intercept room. Here the technical importance of signals became indisputably apparent for the first time. Unfortunately W-Leit 2 was transferred to the East, early in 1941 and the platoon subsequently fell to the lot of W-Leit 3. Requests for personnel and equipment were continually ignored by W-Leit 3, which could not overlook the fact that its own intercept companies had been overshadowed by this platoon.

The tactical successes achieved by signals intercept that benefited fighter units also brought a more favourable relationship between signals and headquarters and this included Chi-Stelle, that became renowned. Of course the unfortunate internal politics played with the key positions of the service and this prevented a steady growth in the unit. The Luftwaffe at that time contained too many rough edges and contradictions, and despite all its supposed veneer of modernity, it was still burdened with too much inveterate Prussianism to be capable of instituting radical changes directly following great successes. Thus, those young successful soldiers did not become the decisive factor in the next period of signals development, but rather the old reserve and career officers, unfamiliar with signals work, who held key positions by virtue of their rank and age and whose paralysing and often destructive influence was characteristic of the Signal Intelligence Service in the west.

==== Training ====
Although civilian employees had been trained in Army intercept stations during peacetime, the signals training of military personnel was totally neglected. Therefore, when the number of personnel increased tenfold in the early months of the war, newcomers received little training and had to develop their own ideas and methods independently. In order to remedy this intolerable situation, a signals school was created under the control of W-Leit 3, in which radio operators and evaluators were given the experience necessary for their profession.

=== Mid 1940 ===
==== General ====
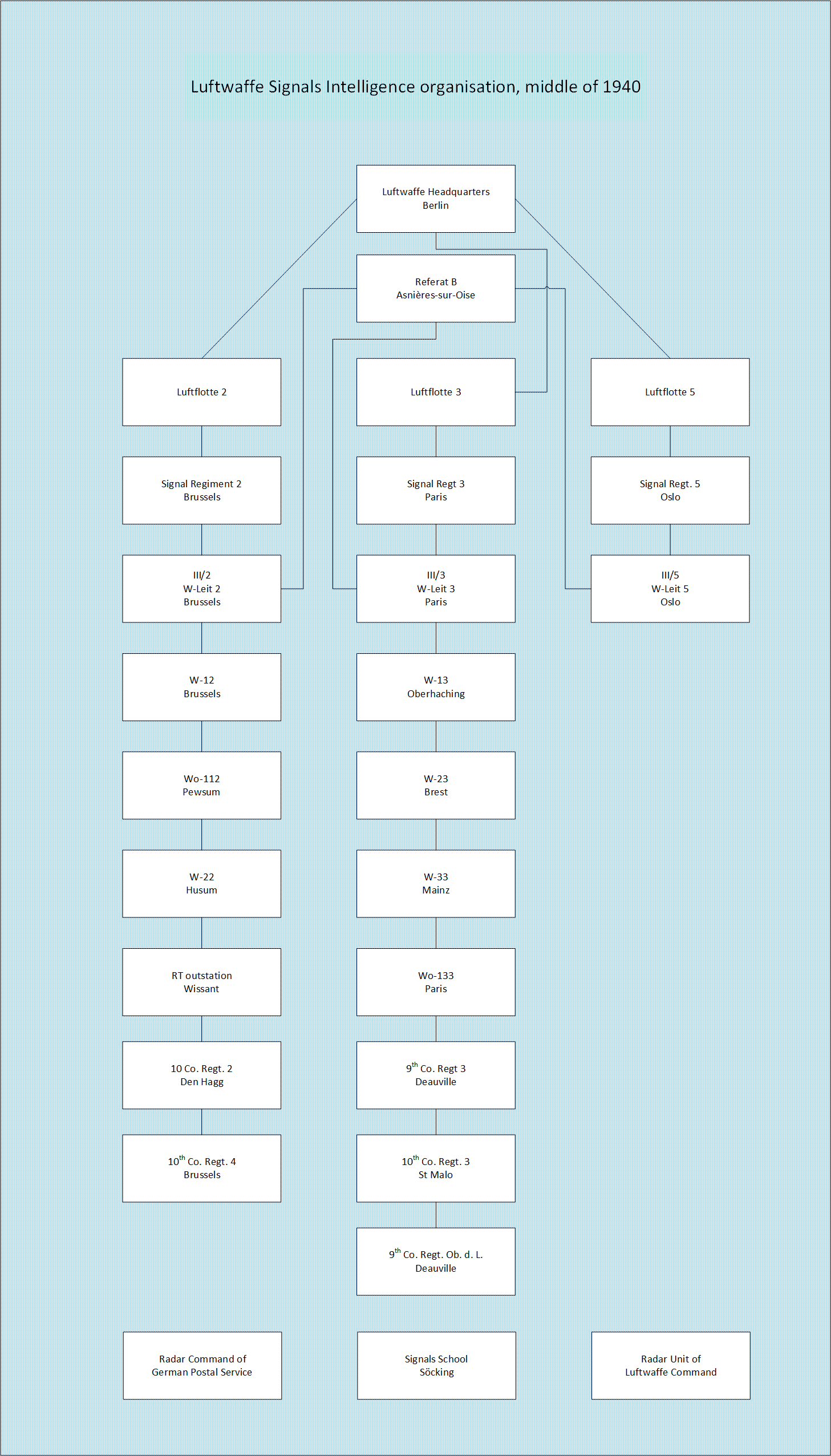
Luftwaffe signals organisation in west Europe, middle of 1940

The surprisingly quick collapse of the Allies in the French campaign of 1940 offered little opportunities for signals to expand. Few staff officers realised the importance of immediate evaluation of intercepted message traffic. Tactical and strategic evaluation of signal intelligence was in its infancy, on the one hand because competent signals officers were themselves not aware of its possibilities and on the other hand, because headquarters were orientated to regard Chi-Stelle in the same breath as they did secret agents.

==== Organisation ====
Luftwaffe signals organisation in the west of Europe, in the middle of 1940. The whole system included had three W-Leit, five fixed signal intercept stations with five companies, totalling approximately 2000 men. Each station or W-Leit was capable of intercept Wireless Telegraphy (WT), Radiotelephone (RT) transmitting on the high frequency band

An insight into signals development in 1940 can be determined from the following facts.

- Signals intelligence was made available only to the Luftwaffe Operations staff and to Luftflotte headquarters. Any liaison with flying units was forbidden by General Wolfgang Martini on the grounds of security.
- General staff were often incapable of comprehending this new form of intelligence and were distrustful of it. Consequently, Signal Corps personnel found it difficult to offer advice to headquarters. Only after a long period of trial was Chi-Stelle able to win representation for itself at command posts and at headquarter staffs.
- The assignment of the signal battalions to the individual Luftflotten caused a certain disunity in respect to personnel and equipment. The Chi-Stelle which at the time still clung its peace-time traditions was unable to assume the overall direction of operations as it was still short of operational experience.
- A shortage of signals officers existed.
- A great shortage of technically qualified personnel existed. The new personnel who were being continually received for training by signals, consisted mostly of academic students and linguists among whom were seldom people with a technical interest. General Martini was unable to produce a carefully planned policy regarding personnel. To these were added the following operational difficulties:

- The battalions were administratively subordinate to Chief Signals Officers of the Luftflotten and to the regimental commanders who were unfamiliar with this field of work.
- They received their operational instructions from the Chi-Stelle Referats. The results of this were:

- The different conceptions on the part of the Luftflotten and their Chief Signal Officers concerning warfare itself and their respective demands upon Signals Intelligence.
- The refusal of the W-Leitstellen to recognise the corresponding Referat of the Chi-Stelle as the final agency controlling signals intelligence. These W-Leitstellen regarded the Referats of the Chi-Stelle as an unnecessary organisation.

==== Strength ====
The Signals units located in the west comprised:

Unit Strength
Unit	No. of Men
3 W-Leitstellen	600
5 Fixed Signals Stations	700
5 Signals Intelligence companies	700
Total Personnel	2000

==== Locations ====
The W-Leitstellen were located either at or near Luftflotten headquarters. The fixed signals intercept stations moved more slowly. Signals companies were already established on the coast of Netherlands, Belgium and France. Each company and fixed intercept station had a WT and RT platoon as well as an evaluation section and its own DF unit.

==== Evaluation ====
Each intercept station and signal company analysed its allotted material that led to considerable duplication of effort and in light of the results obtained, a waste of personnel and equipment. Two reports were forwarded daily by wire to the W-Leitstelle and to Referat B. Daily logs were forwarded by courier to the W-Leitstelle and also to Referat B to be evaluated. In spite of this duplication of work, the individual companies were allowed to operate independently, their independence varying with the ability of the company commander and the evaluators. Competition and jealousy were known to exist.

Daily reports and other report types at this time contained only descriptions of the radio traffic, including list of Call signs and traffic identification. Detailed explanations were seldom given. In addition, intelligence from other sources was furnished to the Chi-Stelle by the Ia-Dienst (operations) staff of headquarters while the W-Leitstellen received their collateral intelligence from the Ia-Dienst (operations) of the Luftflotten.

Problems concerning Allied fighter control, installations and functioning of Allied radar, use of call signs by RAF fighters and bombers were still unsolved.

Intelligence from both the special radio section of the German Post Office, the Pers Z S and from the Procurement Division of the Luftwaffe dealing with radar intercept and jamming was so shrouded in secrecy that in the case of W-Leit 3, only one commanding officer and one technician were permitted to have access to these reports.

In the Calais-Boulogne-sur-Mer area that was controlled by Luftflotte 2, the concentration of signals intercept stations and Naval DF units brought about closer liaison with the commanders of fighter units and with Naval formations.

==== Communication ====
The communication channels consisted of:

- One telephone or teleprinter line from each signals company and intercept station and in some cases also from the outstations to the Leitstelle.
- One teleprinter or telephone line from each W-Leitstelle to Referat B, also to the Luftflotte headquarters and to the neighbouring W-Leitstellen.
- Telephone lines between the various companies and signal stations.
- Telephone and teleprinter line from the W-Leitstellen and signals companies to the Luftwaffe exchanges.
- Telephone lines from the signals companies and intercept stations to the outstations and DF units.

The land-line system was the prototype for lines later installed to operational units and was constructed by a construction battalion that was part of the Luftflotte. It proved a disadvantage to Luftwaffe Signals to not have any construction platoons of its own. The W-Leitstellen were equipped with their own telephone and teletype exchanges.

==== Liaison ====
Referat B disseminated information to the Luftwaffe Operations Staff. Missions within the operations context of their respective Luftflotten was assigned to the W-Leitstellen by the Chi-Stelle. The Luftflotten reserved the right to request additional intelligence with that defined context as created by the Chi-Stelle.

=== Mid 1941 ===
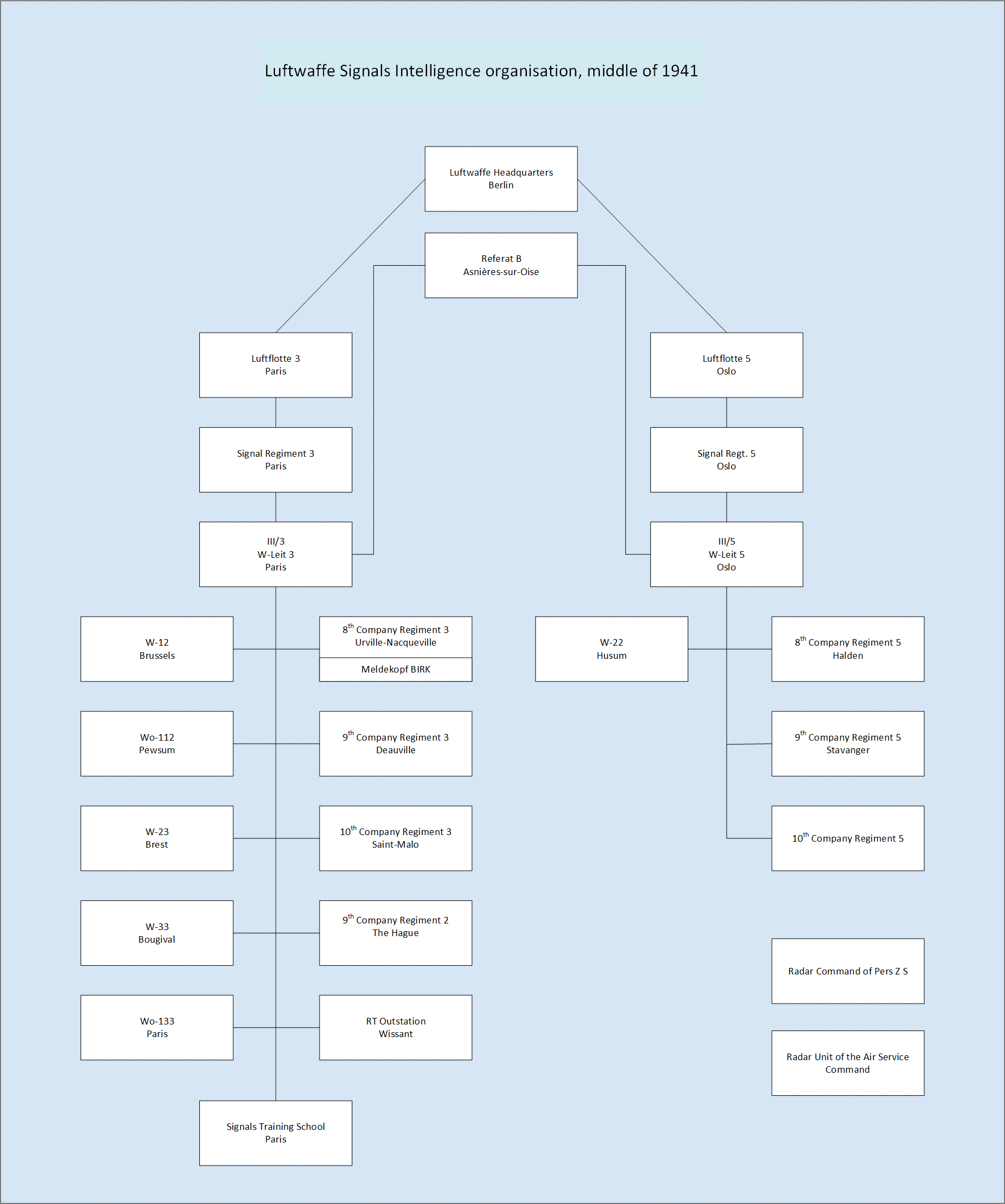
Luftwaffe signals organisation per unit chart in western Europe during the middle of 1941

This diagram details the geographical layout of Luftwaffe signals intercept stations in the west of Europe during the middle of 1941

==== General ====
The Luftwaffe signals organisation growth was the main accomplishment in 1941 and consisted of:

- The organisational focus of the unit improved when the commander of Chi-Stelle transferred to W-Leitstelle 3
- The withdrawal of Luftflotte 2 in the middle of 1941 and the subordination of units belonging to W-Leitstelle 2 in Belgium and Holland to W-Leitstelle 3.
- An increase in cooperation.

==== Organisation ====
As the unit grew a large number of problems manifested compared to mid 1940 including a number of problems that still remained unsolved.

- A number of signals liaison officers were created increasing cooperation between operational units with varying results.
- The distrust show towards intelligence staff lessened as the value of intelligence started to be known. However, in many units reports were still being read of out curiosity rather than tactical value.
- A critical shortage of men and officers existed in Germany. A typical example consisted of 10 officer candidates completing signals intelligence training with only three remaining in Signals. Signals were considered to be useless as a military career and for that reason the standard requirements for officers was reduced. Attendance at the Chi-Stelle Academy in Söcking was substituted for the Heer and Luftwaffe Signals School at Halle in the case of Signals officer candidates. In this manner a new corps of signals officers was created from within its own ranks. However the short period of training resulted in the officers being deficient in experience.
- The demand for evaluation staff, wireless telegraphy and radio telephone operators always exceeded supply of personnel. At the start of the war, the customary peace-time 5-watch system was changed to a 4-watch system. An increasing flow of messages required the introduction of a 3-shift system with a high degree of specialisation throughout the evaluation units. The old peace-time bureaucracy still prevailed with the best staff not being advanced quick enough.
- The makeup of the staff changed as the tension between military and specialised aspects of the work was to a certain extent eliminated by preferential treatment of signals staff regarding promotion.
- Difficulties from badly trained staff and shortage of personnel could not be improved with reserve officers still holding the majority of the important positions and were generally both technically and militarily unfit.

==== Locations ====
The fixed signals stations personnel with the exception of the Husum intercept station left their installations and quarters in Germany and moved to the occupied areas in the west. The signal units of Luftflotte 2 remaining in the west were subordinated to W-Leitstelle 3 and this became the central evaluation headquarters for all signals units in the west. To facilitate liaison with the Chi-Stelle, Referat B moved to Asnières-sur-Oise in October 1940.

At the same time the W-Leitstelle 3 began to exercise an influence on the DF sections of the companies. High frequency Direction finding (DF) units from the northern tip of Denmark down to Biarritz were lined into several DF networks each covering a large area. The radio and direct land-line communications of the DF units made possible a large scale and extremely efficient DF system. Although the respective companies were by degrees being brought up to strength in both men and equipment, nevertheless the DF evaluation section of W-Leitstelle 3 continued to retain control and direction of the greatly increased DF missions. This development was furthered by the success of this large DF system in plotting British reconnaissance aircraft over convoys in the Atlantic. W-Leitstelle worked in close cooperation with the Atlantic Air Force commander, Generalmajor Karl Koller and the submarine commander at Lorient.

Each company slowly developed its own speciality. Wissant and Urville expanded into fighter-warning centres which were most important for the protection of German reconnaissance aircraft. Originally individual units were informed by telephone of messages that were of interest to them. However the demands upon Luftwaffe signals from these units quickly grew so immense that individual service could not be given to each staff, group or squadron. Therefore, a fighter-warning and air situation broadcast was established. All the positions of British day and night-fighters that had been determined, were made known by means of the broadcast. The unit command posts decoded these messages and gave instructions to their aircraft in flight. By this means numerous German reconnaissance aircraft received information as to when they had first been plotted by the British Air Raid Warning Service, where patrolling fighters would intercept them, what types of aircraft had been sent to intercept them and so on. Not only reconnaissance units but also German fighter and bomber units, Air-Sea Rescue Service units, Schnellboot (S-boats) and convoy units made use of this broadcast. From the end of 1940 until the Allied invasion the broadcast facilitated this difficult task for all aircraft and ships in the Channel area.

In November 1940 the RAF Fighter Command began to re-equip their fighters with VHF. Beginning with the control stations and squadrons of 11 Group, one group of traffic after another gradually disappeared. At that time Germany paid dearly for their neglect in not researching VHF intercept techniques and their persecution of radio amateurs early in the war. The only available VHF DF receiver, known as Victor proved to be unsuitable because of its short range. The development of the E receiver, which had the correct band spread, had not yet been completed. The collapse of the German warning service on the channel coast was imminent. Only the use of the French SADIR VHF DF receiver beginning in February 1941 saved the situation for the Luftwaffe. As the British Fighter Command had not changed their call signs at the same time as their equipment was changed, the traffic of the two most important groups was available for interception. Had the Allies changed their call signs the Luftwaffe would have been forced to undergo a long wait until a suitable VHF DF device was invented and a suitable organisation evolved to take advantage of it.

The French SADIR VHF DF device proved to be excellent enabling both ground stations as well as aircraft clearly being heard within a range of 150-200Kilometres. Beyond this range, reception depended greatly on atmospheric conditions. Problems with its use by German forces still existed, particularly with the aerial. At first the SADIR was used with a horizontal Dipole aerials, made by troopers themselves and placed directly on the set. Then directional aerials were tried and later aerial poles bent upward on each end greatly improved reception. In addition conic and mattress-type aerials were tried out. In spite of these experiments it never became possible to increase the range, especially in the case of ground stations.

==== Evaluation ====
The creation of the Meldeköpfe, the construction of HF and VHF DF systems, liaison with headquarter staffs and other units, all brought new aspects to the field of final evaluation. Liaison was also established with the Dulag Luft in Oberursel.

Daily and monthly reports were divided into tactical and technical sections. The tactical reports included a description of Allied air activity, while the technical part was a systematic compilation and identification of all intercepted traffic.

==== Communication ====
(Fig 8) Signals liaison officers at command posts and higher headquarters were included in the communication network.

==== Liaison ====
From autumn 1940 a signals liaison officer was assigned to the advanced command post of Luftflotte 3 in Deuxville. Liaison officers were also assigned to the 2nd and 3rd Fighter commands, to Atlantic Air Command and to Fliegerkorps IX. Unfortunately the initial selection of liaison officers were found to be completely unsuitable with the result that liaison only began to work smoothly only after many changes in personnel, including the eventual assignment of this work to thoroughly experienced technical sergeants.

The headquarters that were interested in the tactical Signal Intelligence received their reports directly from intercept companies and out-stations. An exception to this was the fighter-warning and air situation messages. The W-Leitstelle 3 devoted itself increasingly to final evaluation with the exception of intercept messages which were of concern only to the Kriegsmarine. W-Leitstelle effectively competed with Referat B with both of these organisations issuing monthly reports.

=== Mid 1942 ===
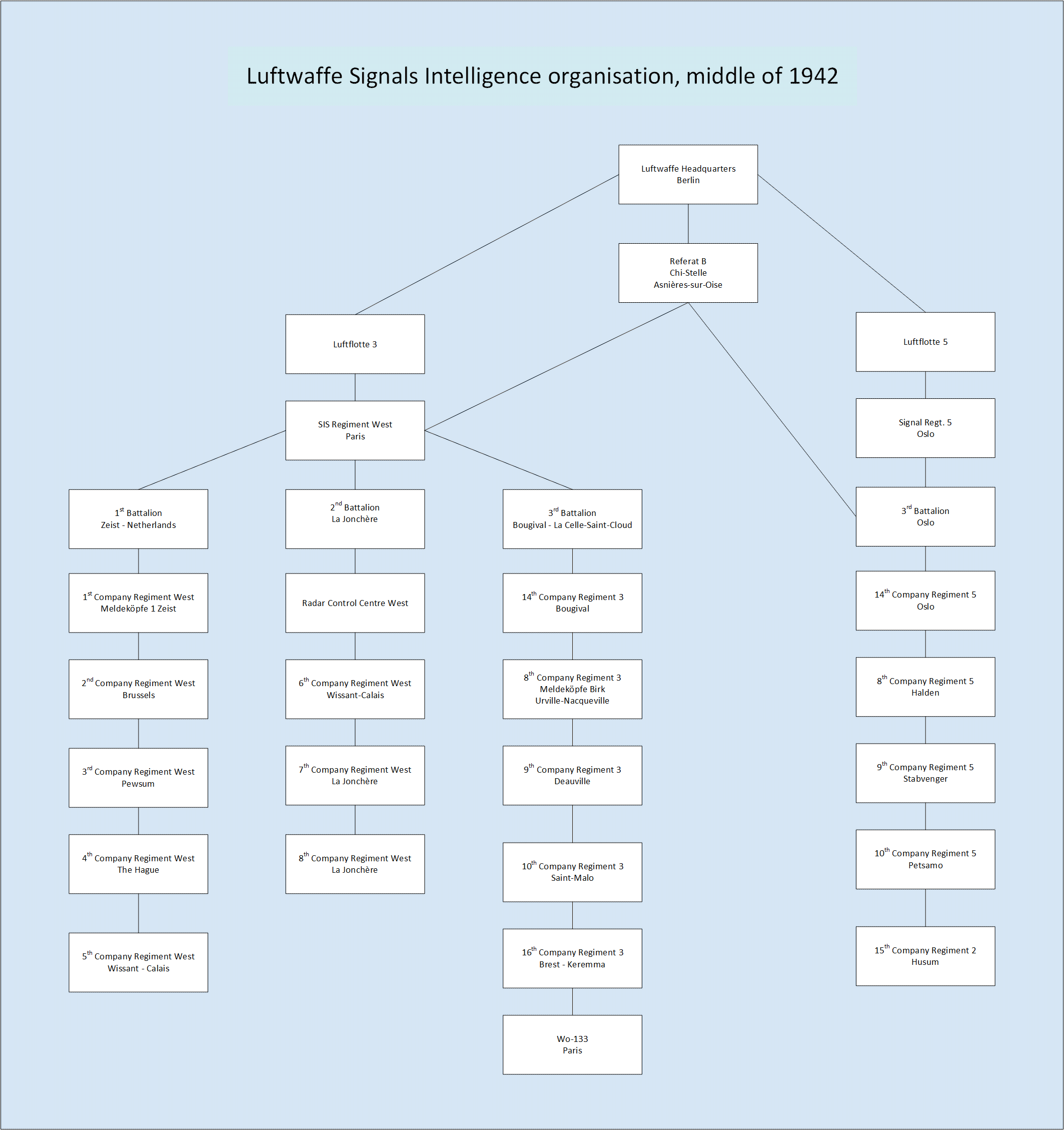
Fig 9. This diagram details the geographical organisation of the Luftwaffe signals intelligence organisation in the west, during the middle of 1942. The area covered in Norway, France, the low countries and Belgium

Fig 10. This diagram details the geographical layout of Luftwaffe signals intercept stations in the west of Europe, in the middle of 1942. Each station location describes the types of signal that station can intercept. HF is high Frequency, VHF is very high frequency, WT is wireless telegraphy, RT is radiotelephone

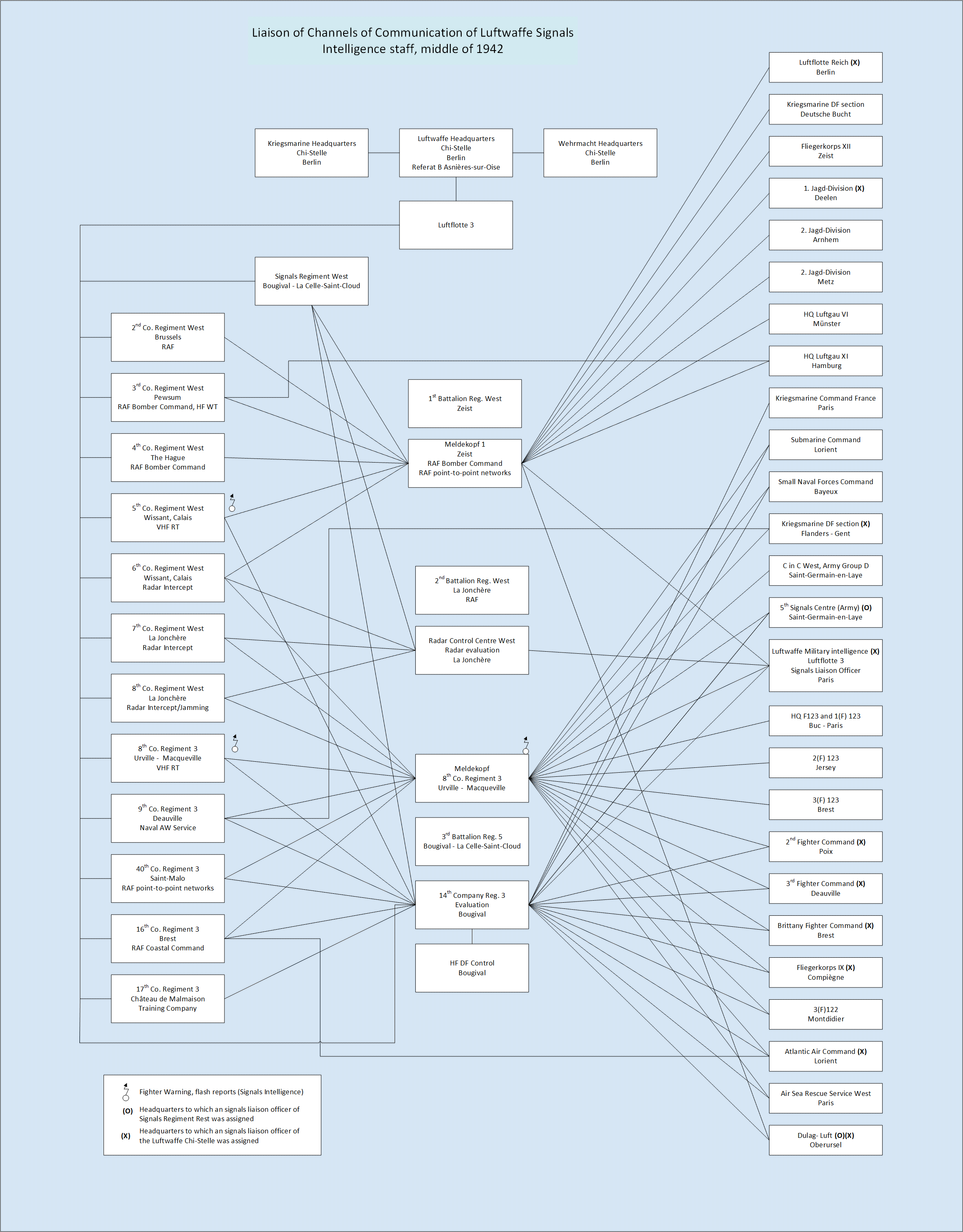
Fig 11.Liaison channels for Luftwaffe signals staff in the west of Europe, during the middle of the year 1942

==== General ====
The monitoring area of W-Lietstelle 3 included Denmark, German Bight, Netherlands, Belgium and Northern France and western France. There were also three out-stations in Spain which had been set up during that period. That area was too large and could no longer be taken care of by the staff of a single battalion. Moreover, the battalion became too large, both as to the number of men and also in the number of subordinate companies. This resulted in the decision taken in December 1941 for a proposal for the activation and organisation of a Signals Intelligence regiment.

==== Organisation ====
The Royal Air Force heavy bomber formations were beginning to attack Germany. While the Luftwaffe command was combining offensive units within Luftflotte 3 that had greatly reduced its strength through continuous action, there also began an expansion of the defence system with Germany that was conducted under the command of Luftflotte Reich, first against night raid aircraft units and later against aircraft flying on day raids.

With the expansion of the war into fronts, the importance of Luftwaffe signals in the west increased. Luftflotte 3 became increasingly dependent on the intelligence reports from the Referat. The radar organisation that by 1942 had pass the experimental stage and was now active units. In the same year the unit Signals Regiment West that was assigned to Luftflotte 3 and organised into three battalions.

- 1st Battalion Signal Intelligence Regiment (West)
  - 1 Evaluation company
  - 3 WT and DF intercept companies
  - 1 RT intercept company

The 1st Battalion was formed from:
- an intercept station in Pewsum,
- the 9th company of signals regiment of Luftflotte 2 situated in The Hague,
- an intercept station in Schepdaal
- a VHF DF platoon in Wissant
- an intercept station in Bougival

as well as units of W-Leitstelle 3 in Bougival.

The battalion was posted to the area of German Bight, Netherlands and Belgium and had the following missions:

- Interception of HF Wireless Telegraphy and Radio Telephone traffic of the RAF Bomber Command, later also the USAAF and all traffic relating to it. Monitoring at the same time of 16 Group, RAF Coastal Command.
- Independent evaluation of this traffic and issuing of reports.
- Forwarding of tactical intelligence to Luftflotte 3 HQ and to the commanders of Luftflotte Reich and Fliegerkorps III. For this to purpose appropriate evaluation staff were transferred from the W-Leitstelle 3 to Zeist.

The three WT companies gave the greater part of their analysts to the evaluation company in Zeist. Flash reports like the monthly reports were thereafter done by the evaluation company only. In this manner Meldeköpfe 1 came into existence, its original mission being to provide advance warning of enemy raids.

- 2nd Battalion Signal Intelligence Regiment (West)
  - 1 evaluation company, located in the Radar Control Centre
  - 2 radar intercept companies
  - 1 jamming company

The 2nd Battalion was from the two special radar units of the German Postal Service and the Luftwaffe Procurement Division and the replacements that later followed. The area covered by the battalion included the Netherlands, Belgium and France and had the following missions:

- Interception of heavy, medium and light ground signals
- Monitoring of navigational aids
- Interception of airborne radar
- Jamming of Allied ground and airborne radar
- Independent evaluation of these monitoring commitments and issuing of reports.

The importance of radar interception increased day by day and in working with signals soon surpassed the backward and inflexible Air Raid Warning Service. The interception of British ground radar in connection with the RT traffic gave a clear picture of enemy fighter control methods. Radio beacons and directional beam installations furnished an additional medium for the prediction of raids by heavy bomber units. The monitoring of the Identification friend or foe recognition signal with Cathode-ray tube and the DF-ing of this signal meant it was possible to plot Allied formations and determine the organisations they belonged. In this manner Allied fighters and bombers could be identified and fighter defence give timely warning and instructions.

- 3rd Battalion, Signal Regiment 3, Legion Condor

As the battalion was formed out of the 3rd Battalion of Signal Regiment 5, this name was retained for reasons of tradition.

This battalion consisted of the following:
- 1 evaluation company that was formerly the W-Leitstelle 3
- 3 WT intercept companies with individual HF DF networks
- 1 RT intercept company
- 1 school and replacement company

The 3rd Battalion was formed from the W-Leit 3 in Bougival, the 8th, 9th companies of Signal Regiment 3 located in Urville, Deauville, Saint-Malo respectively, signals stations in Brest, and the signals school in Malmaison near Paris. The battalion was stationed in France and had the following missions:

- Coverage of RAF Coastal Command.
- Coverage of RAF Fighter Command and later the 8th USAAF Fighter Command
- Coverage of RAF Army Cooperation Command, later RAF Second Tactical Air Force
- Coverage of RAF Air Raid Warning Service and radio traffic of the naval air arm, the Balloon Command, RAF Ferry Command, supply, training, transport and unidentified networks.
- Independent evaluation of this traffic and issuing of reports.
- The passing on of tactical intelligence to the units of Luftflotte 3

This battalion had more varied tasks than that of the other two. Its evaluation company lost its position as a central evaluation station for the entire West. The regimental staff was located in this area.

- Staff of the Signal Regiment West

The regimental commander had as his assistant:

List of assistants
Adjutant IIa, IIb	Personnel and administration
Major of the staff	Representative of the commanding officer
IIIN	Signal supply, wire and radio
IIIK	Transportation

In creating the regiment, serious mistakes were made in reference to organisation and personnel. A signals battalion commander from the Eastern Front was assigned as commanding officer of the regiment, as none of the signals officers commanding units in the west had the required length of military service. The officer assigned to this most important position that was considered exceptional difficult brought no skills with him except his seniority. This resulted in him being incapable of selecting able assistants from the personnel of the Western Regiment and this resulted in him becoming what was considered in the German military as being a prisoner of his own staff resulting in the regiment remaining a feeble organisation to which signals officers paid no heed. Two line officers with no signals experience were assigned as commanding officers of the 1st and 3rd Battalions. This led to continual controversies with self-conscious, self assured evaluation officers, some of which took on grotesque forms, e.g. the commanding officer of 1st Battalion had his chief of his evaluation company committed to an insane asylum. For this act he was removed from the battalion and the command was given to his victim who was promoted to captain. In the 3rd battalion the diplomatic cunning of the commander proved superior to his evaluation officers. He changed them continually, leading to a decline in efficiency of the whole company. Finally after numerous failures, it was decided to give the position of commanding officer to a specialist. The 2nd Battalion was commanded by a scientist who was a woeful tactician and after doing considerable damage to the battalion was removed. As a VHF technician he should have been placed in charge of development of radar intercept receivers, he was made commanding officer of the entire radar section in the Office of the Chief Signal Officer of the Luftwaffe, a non-technical position, thereby giving wider scope to his inefficiency as an officer. The three evaluation companies worked completely independently of one another. Operationally there was no controlling responsibility for the regiment. Referat B had directional authority over the companies of the regiments regarding signals and functioned efficiently in studying Allied navigational aids but had no intention of being subordinated to the command of a regiment that had no ideas and would have decreased its own efficiency. However, Referat B was prevented from interfering in the administrative side of the regiment. It would have been ideal to place the evaluation sections under command of the regiment and include Referat B within that command. In this manner, Referat B would not have been reduced in importance, nor the work of Luftwaffe operations curtailed. As things stood however, the growth of signals remained dependent on capable company and battalion commanders instead of an effective hierarchical command structure where every unit was operating efficiently.

==== Strength ====
In the middle of 1942, the regiment consisted of 3 battalions with a total of 14 companies. In addition the Norway battalion consisted of 5 companies. The approximate strength was 3000 men.

==== Operations ====
A sharp division developed between the evaluation and intercept companies, except where evaluation problems arose from special tasks or a geographic location made an exception necessary. Within the battalions a rigid centralisation had already been established due to the existence of the evaluation companies. These companies were in agreement with Referat B regarding the fundamental aim of tactical and operational intelligence, specifically maintaining knowledge of the deployment and organisation of the Allied air forces.

In general each battalion developed independently according to the ability of its commanding officer and his advisors. The 1st Battalion was far ahead of the other two battalions on the exploitation of intelligence. The battalion commander devoted himself to the task of thoroughly covering the Allied heavy bomber units and plotting their routes. He recognised early the wide scope of signals and the Radar Service and the use that could be made of them. The monitoring of heavy bomber units was a field in which the German defence organisation was also greatly interested. Fliegerkorps III that later became Jagdcorps I was operational in the defence of Germany. The battalion was given special considerable in matters of logistics. The aircraft warning and plotting system developed in Meldeköpfe 1 was an exemplary one and following the creation of the Command Post for Radio Evaluation (German: Zentraler Gefechtsstand für Funkauswertung) (ZAF) was adopted by all Luftwaffe signals units.

At first the poorly commanded 2nd Battalion was not capable of establishing its own Meldeköpfe. Its companies established command posts which passed their reports to Meldeköpfe 1. The jamming company also worked independently of the battalion, its jamming equipment deployed along the coast for use against British ground radars.

The least changes occurred in the case of the 3rd Battalion which continued in its accustomed manner of working.

==== Evaluation ====
The form of messages and reports was fixed. Occasionally in a specified sector, reports covering a longer time period were made in order to clarify a certain event or to prevent certain developments.

==== Communication ====
Fig 11 As the diagram showing the liaison and message channels for 1942 indicates, the wire network was further expanded. In addition to the individual teleprinter lines within the companies, several telephone lines were available and running from the switchboards of the evaluation companies to the intercept companies. Additionally there was one or two line networks connecting to the signals liaison officers at headquarters. The diagram does not take into account the various direct lines from the companies to the liaison officer, for the purpose of achieving the minimum of delay.

The whole construction of the communication network was founded on the principle of passing on intercepted traffic as quickly as possible. A delay of more than 2 minutes could not be tolerated. This expansion made the building of large telephone exchanges:

- Exchange Pirate Meldeköpfe 1 of the 1st Battalion
- Exchange "Breakwater" Radar intercept centre west of 2nd Battalion
- Exchange "Clairvoyant" Evaluation company of the 3rd Battalion and also the regimental exchange.

The regimental exchange finally comprise 5–6 FD 16's (switchboards) with about 150 trunk lines and 250–300 local drops. In addition to the normal company telephone exchanges, in the case of the 8th company and the 55th company, DF control communications had to be installed. The regimental teleprinter exchange had 6–8 lines to the Luftwaffe exchanges in addition to lines to the companies and signals liaison officers. There were three secure teleprinters for secret messages and 8–10 for secret communications. Altogether about 500–700 teleprinter messages were handled daily.

==== Liaison ====
The liaison of individual evaluation stations with other units and headquarters varied greatly. In the case of the 1st Battalion its forces were concentrated. The operational and tactical work was incorporated in Meldeköpfe 1. As command of the defence of Germany was the responsibility of Fliegerkorps III, whose presence in the area made it unnecessary to send liaison officers either to that headquarters or to its divisions, the company commander and his assistants advised those headquarters from the Meldeköpfe. It was only necessary to assign an officer to Luftflotte Reich to protect signals intelligence interests there. A liaison officer was also assigned to the Fighter Command in the Netherlands.

The 2nd Battalion was unable to furnish its own liaison officers. The reports of this battalion were either passed to Meldekopf 1 or sent directly to the liaison officers. Later a separate message centre for radar reports was established in the Meldeköpfe 1 area in Corfu North.

The liaison officer sent to Luftflotte 3 Headquarters by the 3rd Battalion did the staff work. The officer had to compile operation reports in addition to those of the individual signals stations and had to contribute to the daily combat report. In ways the officer's work competed with that of certain technical staff advisers on the Luftwaffe operations staff.

Due to the feebleness of the regiment, the signals liaison officers were able to establish their own channels for operational messages. They received reports directly from the intercept stations, DF controls and radar intercept stations; this should have been the duty of the Meldeköpfe. In this way the headquarters lost patience with the regiment and the well-received unity of the signals intelligence unit was weakened.

The signals liaison officer with the Atlantic Air Command was actually an officer from the 16th company in Brest, that was responsible for RAF Coastal Command. Here less importance was attached to the general air situation and the growth of the enemy air forces than to the operations of the Coastal Command in the Bay of Biscay and the Atlantic.

Liaison with B-Dienst was the responsibility of Luftflotte Headquarters. B-Dienst was considered very timid and for a long time had prohibited telephone conversations pertaining to signals. In the first years of the war, intercepted messages from the British air raid warning network Nora and enciphered using Loxo was found to contain sufficient information to predict the timing of air raids.

=== Mid 1944 ===
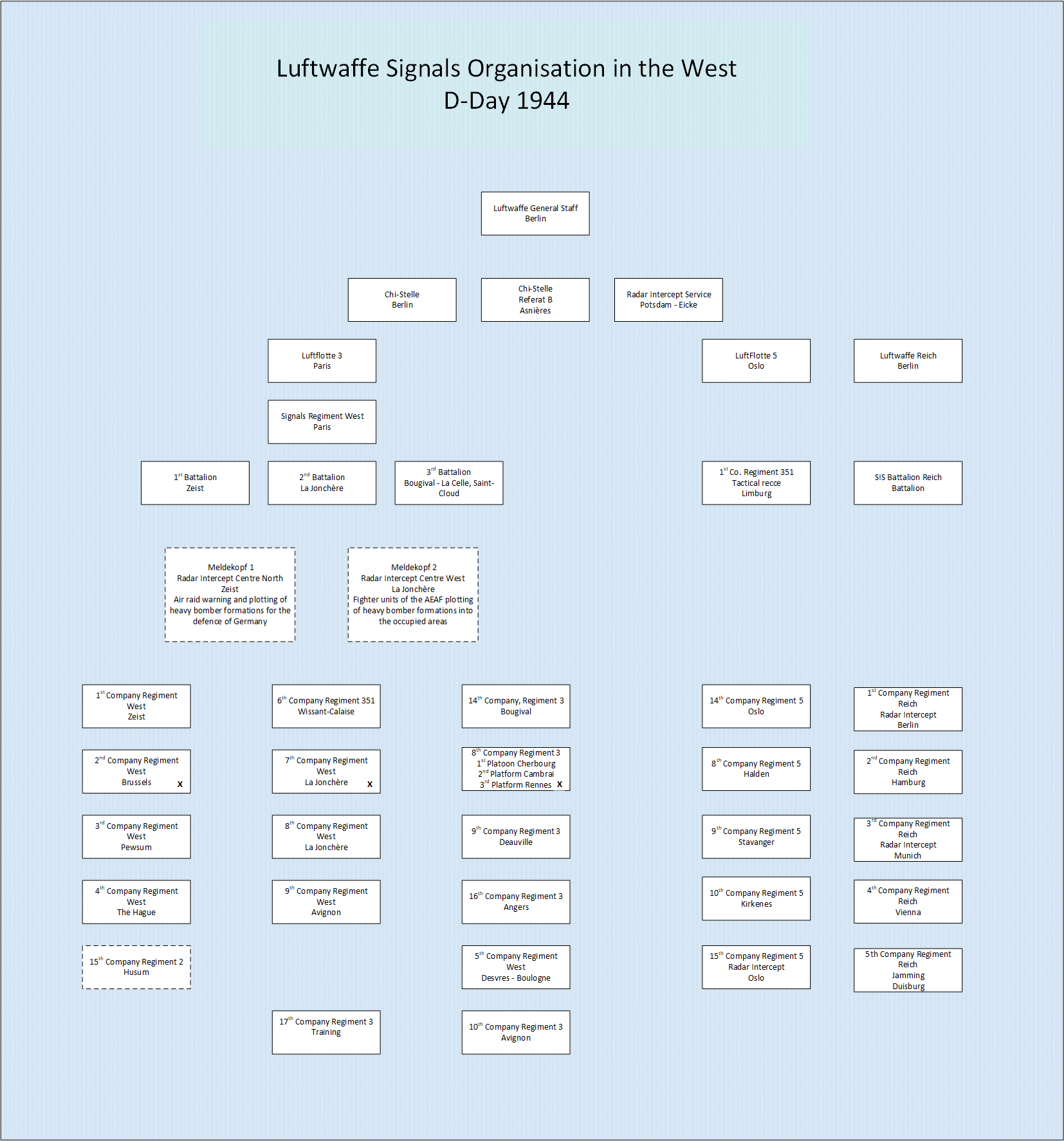
This diagram represents the organisational layout for Luftwaffe signal units prior to D-Day 1944.

Fig 13. The Geographical layout of the Luftwaffe signals intercept stations in the west of Europe, during 6 June 1944, D-Day

This diagram represents the geographical locations of a number of Direction-Finding (DF) base lines in west Europe, that were created by the Luftwaffe, and in place before D-Day. DF baselines are imaginary lines or axes in which DF equipment of a DF network is deployed in locations on that line. Luftwaffe Signals used straight DF lines. The length of the base line indicated the net location capability value in miles, in which a DF location can be made. For example, the distance from Husum, Germany to Brest, France is 716 miles, meaning that the net location capability is 716 miles in depth.

Fig 15. This diagram represents the organisation of a number of Luftwaffe Very High Frequency (VHF) Direction-Finding (DF) base lines that were created by the Luftwaffe, and in place before D-Day

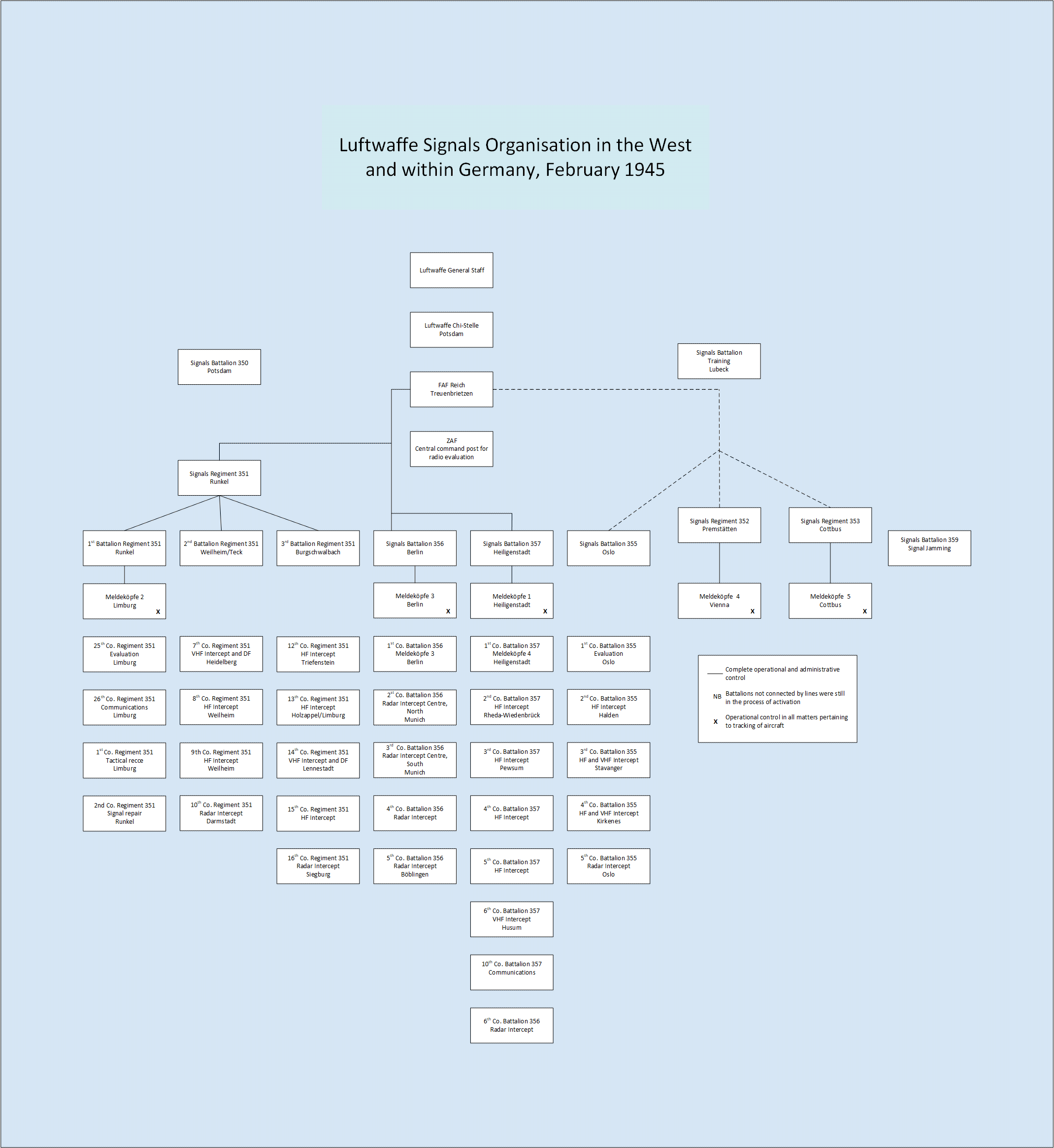
Fig 16. Luftwaffe signals organisation in the west and within Germany, February 1945

==== General ====
In the two years previous to the invasion, further expansion had taken place. From a modest start a radio intelligence agency for the defence of Germany was created. Its mission was to plot aircraft and monitor radar within the borders of Germany. Thus Luftwaffe signal intelligence was able to give an appreciation British and American Air Forces in the United Kingdom. It became an essential component of the German defence system and of the German Fighter Command particularly.

==== Organisation ====
Although the battalion in Norway also had in the course of time to turn to the east, using the RT station opposite Murmansk and stations in Finland, its chief task remained the monitoring of 18 Group of RAF Coastal Command, for the protection of the German Convoy route along the west coast of Norway. The fixed intercept station in Husum was the connecting link between the W-Leitstelle 5 in Oslo and Meldeköpfe 1 regarding heavy bomber raid intelligence. In the event of an invasion, the intercept station in Husum would be subordinate to the 1st Battalion.

The Signal Regiment West carried out all signal intelligence assignments in the west. It maintained the opinion that only a single and closely knit organisation in the west could intercept and evaluate in a uniform manner. The Luftwaffe Operations staff and Luftwaffe Reich planned to place a certain emphasis on the expansion of the defence of Germany. The support given to the 1st Battalion in the Netherlands and the resources at the disposal of signals battalion Reich, surpassed by far those available to the units under Luftflotte 3. Two questions were frequently discussed at the time:

- That of splitting the regiment into two battalions, one for the defence of Germany and the other for operations on the front.
- That of subordinating signals in whole or in part to the Fighter Command.

Firstly, owing to the lack of qualified people who had an understanding of the situation, there was a separation of radio intercept from radar intercept. The regimental commander was unable to combine the radio and radar intercept platoons in his company, even though he was aligned with the wishes of the Chief Signal officer of the Luftwaffe. Individual incompetence, exaggerated sensibility towards the feelings of the battalion commanders, impassiveness and reluctance to act prevented the exercising of any distinct influence on the part of regimental HQ. Only the commander of the 1st battalion had combined intercept channels and forming a concentration of all forms of signal intelligence and who was subsequently entrusted by the Hermann Göring with the creation of a central signal intelligence flash report evaluation section called the Command Post for Radio Evaluation (German: Zentraler Gefechtsstand für Funkauswertung) (ZAF), located in Treuenbrietzen.

Radio intercept stations were established all over Germany on an accelerated schedule. They were used to plot the routes of heavy bomber formations which were bombing German cities with increasingly heavy attacks.

Meldeköpfe 1 was originally created to serve Jagdkorps I. As its successes became more widely known, Luftflotte 3 also wanted to have a Meldeköpfe. As a considerable part of the signal regiment was stationed in Paris where the Luftflotte Headquarters was located, a second Meldeköpfe was created using the resources of the 2nd Battalion. Meldeköpfe 2 specialised in covering Allied tactical air forces as well as plotting the routes of aircraft in the German-occupied areas in the west. Later it covered the Allied invasion air forces from Limburg.

The enormous strain put on signals forced the different signals units to cooperate with each other to optimize resources. The 1st Battalion was again the most efficient. Therefore, the companies of the 3rd Battalion that used VHF sets had to intercept RT traffic from heavy bomber formations for the 1st Battalion and to place their large HF DF networks at the disposal of the 1st Battalion. This network was used to DF messages from the RAF giving wind conditions over Western Europe. In Germany the original Meldeköpfe 1 established its own DF organisation with the help of the Safety Service Regiment Reich.

The expansion of the radar organisation within Germany necessitated the transfer of Meldeköpfe 1 and this became urgent when Jagdkorps I moved from Zeist to Treuenbrietzen. Therefore, the commander of the 1st Battalion was entrusted with the creation of a central Meldeköpfe to cover the whole of Germany. This was the ZAF. The ZAF was directly subordinated to the Chief Signal Office of the Luftwaffe and who had direct authority over the Meldeköpfe and over the evaluation of radio intelligence where a uniform method of plotting bombing raids was concerned.

From the beginning of 1944 two problems had come to the fore for the regimental commands:

- The closing down and withdrawal of out-stations concentrated on the Channel coast
- The motorizing of fixed companies and platoons situated in areas which would probably become operational.

The regiment had a distinct order that in the event of a move it would not interrupt operations of the intercept companies or the Meldeköpfe. All staffs had agreed that the units of the regiment must be maintained in the event of a retreat on the part of the Headquarters. However, only after several months of discussion had taken place could a statement be obtained from Generalfeldmarschall Hugo Sperrle Commander-in-Chief in the west, authorising the battalion commanders to give withdrawal orders to their units in the command area. Only in the event of a definite locate emergency could signals personnel be pressed into combat.

Regarding the question of motorizing static units, the regiment was unable to obtain any further allotment of vehicles in spite of the fact that it had only two fully mobile companies.

In the middle of the 1944 Reichsmarschall Hermann Göring was considering placing radio intelligence directly under the command of Luftwaffe Headquarters. Such a decision would have been welcomed by all members of signals as it would have finally done away with the distinction between administrative and operational control, without changing the structure of the existing units.

==== Strength ====
The strength of the signals units in the west increased to approximately 5000 people in the course of two years. A third of these were women. The regiment with its three battalions, numbered 15 companies. In addition there were two battalions with a total of 10 companies that were specifically committed to Germany.

==== Operations ====
The strength of the companies varied in regard to personnel and equipment according to their tasks. Those companies engaged upon WT interception had from 20 to 50 radio sets. Direction-finding units were concentrated in so-called DF villages along the coast. Here were located DF units used for special company missions, as well as the DF units of the large network used by the evaluation company of the 3rd Battalion.

In the Netherlands and Belgium the only step taken was alternate sites located farther inland, although the units stationed in Brussels and The Hague were ordered to remain there. In France the 16th Company moved from Brest to Angers and parts of the 8th Company from Urville to Cambrai and Rennes. In case of necessity, the 9th Company was to withdraw to Paris. In Southern France the Radar Company and the 10th Company from Montpellier to Avignon.

After Operation Torch, the Allied invasion of French North Africa and the occupation of Western France, the 10th Company was transferred from the Channel coast to the South of France. In the middle of 1943 a VHF RT platoon was situated above Monte Carlo to monitor fighter units and later the Tactical Air Command. The primary mission of the company was to monitor Allied air activity in the Mediterranean Sea with a particular focus on the Gulf of Lyon. Working with the signals battalion in Italy, it was intended to be a warning centre for raids of heavy bombers on Southern France. The Radar Company was activated but never became operational. The evaluation of their results should have been combined with that of the 10th Company.

==== Evaluation ====
The 1st Company was the evaluation company of the 1st Battalion and conducted outstanding independent work in the evaluation of traffic from heavy bomber groups for Referat B. Referat B was particularly good in extracting intelligence from captured documents and equipment. Occasionally the Referat published a report on navigational aids which was esteemed as the most difficult work of signals.

The closes liaison existed between Referat B and the 5th Intercept station, the Army evaluation centre in France. Referat B also had permanent liaison officers at Dulag Luft in Oberursel and had a direct line from Referat B to the camp since autumn 1942. The questions of prisoner of war at Dulag Luft was greatly influenced by Referat B. Attached to the Referat were liaison officers from German fighter, bomber and reconnaissance units who placed their operational experience at the disposal of the evaluation unit. Additionally liaison personnel from the Weather Service and technical bureau of the Luftwaffe were assigned to the Referat.

==== Signal communication ====
(Fig 16) The creation of Battalion Reich and the assignment of signals liaison officers to the divisions of Jagdkorps I made numerous circuits necessary both within Germany and from Germany to the occupied countries. The cabling requirements increased when the ZAF obtained an additional circuit.

At the beginning of 1944 radio stations were established by the regiment at all out-stations, command posts and companies. Each company had:

- a DF control network or a radio link with the out-stations.
- a WT link with the companies battalion HQ
- a WT link with the pertinent Meldeköpfe

The Meldeköpfe was included either as part of the DF control network or with WT link between the company and the out-stations. In the case of line trouble, all tactical reports could reach the Meldeköpfe as soon as possible, and from their broadcast as a flash report to interested HQs. The code used by the Meldeköpfe for enciphering the report consisted of a 1000 word as keys and a cipher table. The message was sent out on both Longwave and Shortwave in 5-figure (5F) groups.

The construction of DF and radar intercept station within the area controlled by the German military, made it impossible for each of the regiments 176 out-stations and 60 out-stations subordinated to signals battalion Reich to each have its own direct line. For this reason the Dente or operational connection was introduced. Using a code word to drive a physical audio synchronisation protocol, any conversation taking place over normal Luftwaffe telephone circuits could be immediately terminated and the line used to quickly pass tactical reports e.g. air raid type and duration.

==== Liaison ====
(fig 16 as well)

At the same time that the Jagd Divisions within Germany were created, signals liaison officers were assigned to them. It was no longer conceivable for the Luftwaffe tactical staff to be without a liaison function. In the event of a line failure, liaison with the Kriegsmarine and the Heer HQ and Luftwaffe signals was broadcast using radio.

The winter of 1943 and the first six months of 1944 were entirely under the influence of the impending invasion. In autumn 1943 a large preconceived map exercise was performed from the operational staff of headquarters for the purpose of training the army in how to liaison with Luftwaffe signals to achieve the best results. It was intended to give not only an insight into the working methods and message channels utilised for signal intelligence operations, but also to portray the initial stage of an invasion and the difficulties that would likely arise for Luftwaffe signals.

The concluding of invasion preparations in England was accurately covered and reported. On the night before the invasion, Meldeköpfe 2 was able to give first warning about 2300 hours, without actually stating that the invasion was actually beginning. By 0100 hours, the unit was clear in its decision that a very large undertaking of a special nature had begun.

==== Course of the invasion ====
Shortly before the invasion the installations on the Channel coast for jamming British radar were completely destroyed. DF and radar intercept sites were also the individual targets of fighter-bomber attacks. During the night before the invasion the intercept station of 8th Company was smashed to pieces by RAF bombers.

On the day of the invasion the last platoon of the 8th Company withdrew to Paris, the 9th company moved from Deauville to Saint Germain also in Paris. DF and outstations in the theatre withdrew to the nearest headquarters after destroying their equipment. After the occupation of France, RAF Bomber Command refrained from switching on its Gee-H radio-navigation equipment until the aircraft had reached a longitude of 3° East, depriving signals of an advance warning of their arrival. After the American breakthrough at Avranches on 12 August, that was concomitant to Operation Bluecoat, the 16th Company and what remained of the DF units on the Atlantic coast were ordered back from Angers to Paris. As Paris was taken by the Allies on 25 August 1944, the entire regiment moved to Wich east of Nancy. By that time Referat B was attached to the regiment. After a short stay in the Lorraine area, the bulk of the regimental units withdrew to finally assemble in Limburg an der Lahn with the 3rd Battalion stationed in the Freiburg im Breisgau and the 1st Battalion stationed with Meldeköpfe 1 in Wiedenbrück.

As trucks were in short supply, a substantial collection of equipment had to be destroyed in the out-stations and barracks and within camps. In Wich, 60 trucks were found by chance, loaded with equipment and transported to the rear. About 300 receivers were lost during the retreat. In Limburg, the concentration of several evaluation section in one place led to the creation of a single, large, regimental evaluation unit. Referat B had sacrificed a large number of its personnel to the newly created air support parties and the remaining personnel were absorbed into the new evaluation unit, but remaining as a military unit, Referat B. The withdrawal in France had shown that the liaison between air and ground units had proved insufficient. For this reason VHF detachments were established at advanced headquarters. VHF detachments were also created for the protection of airfields of individual fighter wings. Other detachments were sent to Army and Army Group headquarters to take signals broadcasts from Meldeköpfe 2 which in turn, serviced them with collateral intelligence.

While the regiment was occupied with its reorganisation in a location on the western border of Germany to which it had retreated, a new signals organisation was adopted by German High Command. The new unit called the Funkaufklärungs-Führer Reich was placed under the command of Oberstleutnant Rudolf Friedrich for operational command and Generalmajor Wilhelm Klemme for administrative command.

=== November 1944 reorganisation ===
The dynamics of signal intelligence operations make it difficult to find any point of rest at which an accurate statement of organisation is possible. However, the several reorganisations of the signal service that occurred in 1944 to fill the needs arising throughout previous operations gave the service its final form.

In the spring of 1944, the first of these reorganisation took place. All signals units including the Chi-Stelle which heretofore had been placed under the command of the Air Ministry, i.e. the Chi-Stelle Ob.d.L. were now the tactical command of Chief Signal Officer, 3rd Division (Gen Nafue II) Oberstleutnant Rudolf Friedrich.

This centralisation in tactical matters and the decentralisation in administrative affairs to the field command units led to difficulties in guidance and supply. As a result, in the autumn of 1944, after an abortive order by Hermann Göring to unify all Luftwaffe signal units through combining all intercept, jamming and radio traffic units as part of Luftwaffe Signal Regiments. This new organisation unified all home and field units into independent signals regiments and battalions with numbers ranging from 350 to 359. Administration was centralised in the Senior Signal Intelligence Officer (German: Höherer Kommandeur der Funkaufklärung) Generalmajor Wilhelm Klemme.

The final organisation provided for centralised control in the Chief Signal Officer (German: General Nachrichten Führer) (abbr. Gen Nafü) instead of the Air Ministry. Under the Chief of Staff of the Chief Signal Officer, three divisions were established:

- Gen Nafü I: Supervised the assignment of signals troops
- Gen Nafü II: Directed communication and Luftwaffe cryptography
- Gen Nafü III: Directed signal intelligence, cryptanalysis and security of own processes

General Nafue III had administrative control over the Chi-Stelle and the commanding officer of General Nafue III was Oberstleutnant Rudolf Friedrich. Under the reorganisation of November 1944 the Chi-Stelle was redesignated Air Signals Battalion 350 (German: Luftnachrichten Abteilung 350) abbreviated as OKL/LN Abt 350. Friedrich in his position of dual command, regulated the planning for the entire German signals service and "as a representative of the Chief Signal Officer remained the supreme authority until the very end on all signals matters of decisive importance". Nominally, however, the administration of signals was the responsibility of the old retainer, Generalmajor Willi Klemme who was named the Senior Signals Officer (German: Höherer Kommandeur der Funkaufklärun). The Chief Signal Officer of the Luftwaffe, General Wolfgang Martini decided to recognise the claims of the fighter arm who required advanced warning of bomber raids and he proposed the creation of the office of Reich Defence Signals Intelligence Service (German: Funkaufklärungs-Führer Reich) (FAF) in November 1944. All signal intelligence matters pertaining to the defence of the Reich were placed in the hands of Colonel Forster who was named Chief of the Reich Defence Signals Intelligence Service (German: Funkaufklärungs-Führer Reich) or colloquially the Reich Signal Intelligence Air Raid Warning Warning Agency.

==== Staff ====
- Office of the Chief Signal Officer

The responsibility of the Chief Signal Officer, General Martini was as follows:

- Regulation and direction of use of men and equipment in the signals troops
- Direction of operations and maintenance of signal communications of the Air
- Direction of use and operations of Air Signals Security and ground installations for radio navigation, signals reports including radar and fighter-control service
- Signals Intelligence
- Radar Observation and Jamming Services

The Chief Signal Officer is responsibly personally to the Reich Minister for Aviation and the Commander-in-Chief of the Air forces; organisationally and operationally to the Chief of Staff of the Luftwaffe.

- Chief of Staff, Office of the Chief Signal Officer

Among the subordinates of the Chief Signal Officer was the Chief of Staff (German: Chef des Stabbes) Oberstleutnant Otto Rudolf Morgenstern who was responsible with executing the orders of General Martini and his duties followed three main lines of action:

- Review of Air Signals Troop allocation and employment
- Preparation, construction, maintenance and operation of all signals communication of the Luftwaffe
- Operational planning and direction of the Air Security, Air Reporting (including radar), Signal Intelligence and Radar Observation and Jamming Service

==== Divisions ====
The three duties of the Chief of Staff were performed by three divisions of the Office of the Chief Signal Officer. The organisational pattern consisted in a separation of each division into four or five functional groups, each of which was in turn subdivided into sections.

- Gen Nafü I:

The 1st division was a specialist section of the Luftwaffe working over the allocations and employment of men and equipment and therefore to be informed by the 2nd and 3rd Divisions on basic problems of allocation, employment of men and equipment of operations, of signal intelligence and of jamming services.

This division was organisation in four groups:

- Group I Directed troop allocations and employment, supervised the general signal service and published organisational and operational regulations.
- Group II Supervised radio navigation and the Luftwaffe security service.
- Group II Supervised reporting including radar and the fighter control service.
- Group IV Responsible for liaison and reviewed questions arising from cooperation between the Kriegsmarine and Luftwaffe.

- Gen Nafü II:

The 2nd division controlled Luftwaffe signal communications and cryptography and security of own processes from an operational and administrative viewpoint. The 2nd division was divided into four groups. These were

- Group I Undertook control planning for the 2nd division.
- Group II Supervised the telephone system.
- Group III Supervised the teletype system.
- Group IV Supervised the use of cryptography in communication. It issued cipher machines, cryptographic and hand cipher, compiled and distributed keys. It did not make cryptographic security studies which was the responsibility of Group IV of the 3rd division.

- Group IV is split in the following sections:

- Section A:

- Radio operations and cryptography
- Direction and surveillance of all radio air security operations of the Luftwaffe
- Review of regulations affecting radio and air security and air operations. Review of Luftwaffe enciphering regulations
- Surveillance of tactical radio operations and radio deception measures
- Allocation of cryptographic systems under control of the Luftwaffe
- Execution of radio practice and radio testing
- Publishing of operational directives for radio operations and radio control of the commander-in-chief of the Luftwaffe

- Section B: Distribution of literature of radio operations.

- Review of all operational codes of the Luftwaffe including the setup of distribution lists and review of requisitions necessary for the coordination or radio operations with the armed forces, in cooperation with other branches of the armed forces.
- Allocation and employment of both ground and airborne flares and other signal devices used in cooperation with other branches of the armed forces.

- Section C: This section was purely administrative

- Compilation and preparation of steganography methods of all types, in cooperation with other branches of the armed forces. Compilation of operational codes.
- Distribution, shipping and control of all secret writing devices and of operational codes.
- Distribution and control of all cipher machines with the exception of enciphered teletype machines.
- Development of new enciphering procedures.

- Section D:

- Review of operational literature for Luftwaffe air security radio operations.
- Supervision of configuration of radio beacons, plane recognition and the allocation of call signs.

- Gen Nafü III:

The 3rd division was the signal intelligence service of the office of the chief signal officer. Its primary function was the direction of analytic operations of the service and consisted of the following groups:

- Group I Directed the allocation, employment and operations of signal intelligence and jamming services.
- Group II Supervised the equipment and technical administration for intercept
- Group III Supervised the equipment and technical administration for enemy radar monitoring and jamming
- Group IV Conducted security studies on Luftwaffe systems, issued security directives and assisted in the development of new systems.

- Group IV is split in the following sections:

- Section A: Control of cipher systems and cipher equipment

- Testing of keying procedure in use in wire and wireless signal communications for the whole Luftwaffe.

- For possible deciphering.
- For areas of use and volume, density and distribution of traffic.
- For message form and content.

- Requisitions for sampling check-up on German signal communication and evaluation of observations, in collaboration with Gen Nafü II.
- Directives for execution of camouflage and radio deception measures n German communication operations, in collaboration with Gen Nafü II.
- Evaluation of decipherment results of German and enemy intercept services and development of countermeasures.
- Examination and testing of keying methods of Allied Air Forces.
- Cooperation with agencies of other branches.

- Section B: Development of keying means and keying methods.

- Development of new keying means and procedures, in collaboration with Gen Nafü II.
- Development of new directives for special keys according to demands of Gen Nafü II.
- Cooperation on tactical and technical demands, in relation to development of new keys.

- Section C: Keying directives.

- Cooperation on publication of signal operations instructions, in collaboration with Gen Nafü II.
- Cooperation on publication of publication of keying directives for new encipherment techniques, in collaboration with Gen Nafü II.

=== Reich Defence Signals Intelligence Service ===
Luftwaffe diagram of the operations room of the ZAF

==== Establishment ====
The FAF unit, directed by Hans Forster, was subordinated to the Chi-Stelle for operational purposes and was an advisor to the Commanding General of Jagdkorps I.

==== Remit ====
The Reich Defence Signals Intelligence Service had the following responsibilities:

- Tracking of allied strategic air force. This unit was directly subordinated to General Wolfgang Martini who issued orders to the unit through the Chi-Stelle via Colonel Rudolf Friedrich.
- The unit was to advise on signals for Jagdkorps I, that was responsible for the air defence of Germany. The ZAF was the units command post and was situated closely to the Jagdkorps I.
- The unit commanded the Luftwaffe signal service in the west.
- The unit was responsible for the entire radar and radio jamming service with Germany.

==== Organisation ====
Fig. 17 Liaison and channels of communication of Chi-Stelle in the west and Germany with Luftwaffe Staffs, German Army and Kriegsmarine.

In the autumn of 1944 the Luftwaffe signals service was heavily damaged and it was assumed that Luftwaffe personnel who had been captured following the invasion would have revealed information to the Allies and this seemed to be more true as the British had become more cautious in their radio traffic.

The commanding general of Jagdkorps I, Generalleutnant Joachim-Friedrich Huth demanded that early warning of approaching enemy aircraft, particularly at night, should continue despite the loss of the French and Belgian sites.

To accomplish this objective, the FAF took the following measures immediately:

- Construction of advanced radar stations on the line between Vosges, Lorraine and Trier
- Reinforcement of the radar stations on the Netherlands coast
- Construction of a new line of radar stations on the right bank of the Rhine
- Reorganisation of the Signal Intelligence Service in the west.
- Redistribution of tasks among individual units of the Chi-Stelle

The Chief Signal Office was further requested to increase the number of radar observer companies as the commanders of existing companies were unable to control the numerous small radar stations that were already in existence.

By consulting with Joachim-Friedrich Huth, it was decided that the Chi-Stelle would be changed to specialise in the tracking of enemy bomber units. No particular interest was attached to enemy fighter cover. Nevertheless, even in this situation, all measures were taken to use available information to the best possible advantage.

After the decision was made the reorganisation of the units in the west was started. The support of the Army and flying units of the Luftwaffe in the operational area had to be secured. It was the main task of LN Regiment 351 to furnish tactical intelligence concerning Allied air forces. After the detachment of the first battalion from the regiment, a new and rather complex reorganisation was necessary. The newly founded 1st battalion, consisted of four companies:

- 25th Company LN Regiment 351. Evaluation company
- 25th Company LN Regiment 351. WT company
- 1st Company LN Regiment 351. Tactical reconnaissance company,
- 2nd Company LN Regiment 351. Logistics and technical repair company.

The previous 2nd and 3rd battalions were reorganised with additional companies. A 4th battalion was detached and assigned to Luftflotte Reich and later subordinated to Signal Regiment Reich and renamed to LN Abteilung 359. These peremptory measures were salutary as only the Signal Officer of the Luftflotte Reich had the means to construct the numerous jamming sets.

The 2nd Battalion operated between the River Main and the Swiss frontier. The 3rd battalion operated between the River Main and the North Sea providing intercept and DF stations in an area that overlapped the area of the 2nd Battalion. The battalions, LN Abteilung 356 and LN Abteilung 357 were responsible for radar and route tracking in the area of Germany.

At the order of the FAF High Command, the Meldeköpfe's reorganisation took place. Additional control stations were added to the Meldeköpfe network. The Meldeköpfe were renumbered as follows after the reorganisation of the ZAF.

- Meldeköpfe 1: Previously located in Wiedenbrück. Moved to Heiligenstadt and subordinated to LN Abteilung 357
- Meldeköpfe 2: Located in Limburg and was subordinated to LN Regiment 351
- Meldeköpfe 3: Located in Berlin and subordinated to LN Abteilung 356. This Meldeköpfe had three radar control centres that were codenamed Korfu. These were:

- Korfu North: Located in Schlawe near Hamburg
- Korfu East: Located in Koźle
- Korfu South: Located in Oberschleißheim

- Meldeköpfe 4: Located in Vienna. Subordinated to LN Regiment 352
- Meldeköpfe 5: Located in Warsaw. Moved in the summer of 1944 to Cottbus. Subordinated to LN Regiment 353.

Similar to signals evolution in the west, the radar infrastructure in Germany underwent a parallel evolution. Radar intercept centres were established. All radar DF bearings were sent to the centres to be evaluated. Later the LN Abteilung 356 battalion took command of these radar Meldeköpfe's.

To reflect the change nature of signals in the Western Front, the commander of LN Regiment 351 Major Ristow had considerable independence when it came interception and analysis operations. This was necessary to avoid any delays in the delivery of intelligence in the case of an emergency.

With the aid of the regiment, observations of enemy radar situated in France and Belgium were used to improve the tracking of Allied Aircraft.

Meldeköpfe 1 played a special role within Fliegerkorps XII and later Jagdkorps I. The commander of the first battalion of regiment west, recognised that the radar service would assume greater importance for the fighter arm and prepared the Meldeköpfe accordingly for such an evolution. Meldeköpfe 1 was the oldest of these units and became a model for all subsequent units and as the personnel of the ZAF has been drawn from Meldeköpfe 1 when it was created, a special relationship existed between the two units.

Friction arose between the FAF and the ZAF related to the tracking of allied fighter cover. As Allied air raids became more intense, from interwoven bomber streams covering Germany from the west and south simultaneously, it was impossible to handle the verbal announcements that were arriving into the operations room of the ZAF. Therefore, a decision had to be made whether to concentrate on bombers or on fighters, since both could not be evaluated at the same time. The FAF insisted on tracking both fighters and bombers due to the importance fighter-tracking represented in determining intended targets. The predilection by training and tradition of the ZAF personnel was for bomber tracking. The problem was never solved, more so since the Luftwaffe intelligence facilities were rapidly smothered under the accumulating weight of the air power directed against Germany.

Meldeköpfe 3, having three radar intercept stations, was at a disadvantage compared to the corresponding battalions of the western regiment, as LN Abteilung 356, which was recently created and lacked experience. Improvement was a primary concern of the FAF. By transferring experienced personnel to the unit, it was noted that it began to improve.

The collaboration with Meldeköpfe 4 became ever more important. The raids from the south continued to increase in number and as the weeks progressed penetrated deeper and deeper into Germany. If the results were not always satisfactory, it was due to the disturbances of long wire lines. However, surprises out of the south happened rarely.

With Meldeköpfe 5 there was little collaboration on the part of the ZAF, as the eastern front contained no strategic air force activity of any importance.

In connection with the reorganisation of the western signal intelligence service, there was a review of all radar intercept stations. Due to the responsibility for logistics being passed from the Luftwaffe to the Reich Ministry of Armaments and War Production, by this point being directed by Albert Speer, the supply of materials to construct new stations proved extremely difficult, even as the demand for technical field equipment increased. To a certain extent, Regiment 351 was able to help itself, whereas Battalion 356 was unable to procure supplies and had to deal with an increasing amount of red tape. The establishment of separate radar observation posts in Germany often required waiting several months for supplies, in spite of the utmost urgency. The special radar centre of Luftgau VI in Münster that functioned to the very end of the war, developed the Naxburg radar. The Naxburg had several advantages compared to the Korfu radar set that was used in signals. The signals intelligence service mistrusted everything that did not originate with them. Only at the end of 1944 was the Naxburg radar generally acknowledged. When it was finally introduced, even into the ground observer organisation, the advantages of its use were clearly evident.

==== Command Post for Radio Evaluation (ZAF) ====
When the command post of Jagdkorps I was transferred to Treuenbrietzen, it became necessary to establish a signal intelligence unit that would aggregate all flash reports available from all Meldeköpfe into a single report. Extensive wire and radio communication nets from the ZAF to the Meldeköpfe and connected to the radar intercept centres and out-stations, were established. As well as the teleprinter connections and inter-office communication between the Jagdkorps I Command Post and the ZAF operations room duty officer, to ensure the best communication links.

== History of operations in the south ==
=== Operations in the south ===
==== General ====
While the Luftwaffe signal intelligence in the west reached a higher state of development, it was in the south that it faced its greater challenge. This was true because it faced an equally aggressive and resourceful foe, an extremely varied physical environment and geographical extent of the Mediterranean theatre of war, wherein its operations were conducted.

In the west, signals intelligence enjoyed the advantages of the concentration of means, excellent wire communications, and proximity to the opponent, and technical problems were reduced to the minimum. In the south, the rule was a wide dispersion of installations, scanty wire communications and insecure transportation and supply routes, were common. Climatic and living conditions, especially in Africa and the Balkans, compared to those in the west, particularly in the Balkan regions, from partisan activities, all had a profound influence on signals.

==== Mid 1940 ====
In the middle of 1940, the Signals Intelligence Service (signals) of Luftwaffe was marshalled almost entirely against Great Britain. Only the French and English traffic from Africa was observed, in the old peace-time manner, by the fixed signals station W-13, located in Oberhaching. Station W-13 was established in 1938 and was working under the direct supervision of Chi-Stelle, with its own evaluation section and DF network. Its reports were forwarded to Referat C in France.

==== Mid 1941 ====
===== General =====
By the middle of 1941, the Luftwaffe was represented in the Mediterranean by Fliegerkorps X, that had been stationed in Norway, and transferred to Sicily in April 1941. From the beginning, Fliegerkorps X was conceived as a naval air arm. After the Balkan countries capitulated, it moved from Sicily to Greece and was later stationed in Crete. Luftwaffe signals were not involved in the Balkan campaign, but it was largely due to the work it had done previously that the Luftwaffe command possessed a thorough knowledge of the Balkan air forces and their deployments, enabling their quick destruction.

Signal Intelligence units that were created in the southern theatre were:

- Transfer of 9th Company of Luftwaffe Signal Regiment 40 from Norway to Sicily and later Athens. Attached to Fliegerkorps X.
- Dispatch of a signals platoon W-13 in Oberhaching to Palermo
- Movement of fixed signals station, W-14 in Premstätten to Vouliagmeni
- The movement of personnel from Referat B from Asnières-sur-Oise to Potsdam to form a new Referat C, for the Mediterranean and Near East

===== Organisation =====
- 9th Company, LNR 40

The company, shortly before being transferred to the southern front, was activated in Norway, with a large percentage of new recruits, but was not considered proficient in signals. In Sicily, it was assigned the coverage of RAF air-to-ground traffic in the Mediterranean and the Balkans. Up to the point of the revision of the first British 4-figure code book, it monitored point-to-point traffic as well, which after reconstruction of the book, yielded intelligence. There was no particular attempt to carry out a very highly developed log analysis or to reconstruct the allied ground organisation from the intercepted traffic. In order to assist the combat units on their missions, airborne RT intercept operators were also dispatched.

At that time the 9th Company of LNR 40 did not experience the same difficulty with staff as did the signals organisation in the west. This was due to Fliegerkorps X operations depending on this company for combat intelligence, as operations were in command of the company, due to the inadequacy of the command structure. This arrangement guaranteed that signal intelligence operations would be coordinated exactly with the requirements of tactical combat units but lost a large measure of independence.

The company had 35 sets in operation, of which 30 were for point-to-point and air-to-ground WT traffic and 5 for RT. Two HF DF units in Portopalo di Capo Passero and Primosole were established and directed by the company.

- WO-313 signals platoon

At the same time, in early 1941, the fixed station in Oberhaching despatched an intercept platoon of about 25 men to Palermo. From that position, it covered the ATC traffic in North Africa, and the Free French traffic in the same area. The significance of the platoon was small.

- W14 Fixed station

At the end of May 1941, after the Balkans had been defeated, W-14 which had been established in Premstätten in 1938, moved to an area close to Athens. The personnel comprised civil service employees, together with newly recruited soldiers.

W-14 took over the point-to-point networks, which up to that time had been covered by the 9th Company of LNR 30, but owing to the shortage of intercept personnel only six receivers were operated at first. In June 1941, WO-312 turned over the coverage of the ATC networks of this unit. In addition, Turkey was covered with four receivers, two of which were for RT. The station established a new DF baseline between Crete and Rhodes.

The rapid growth of the Royal Air Force in the eastern Mediterranean soon made it necessary for W-14 to seek sizeable reinforcements. As it appeared that the next large-scale objectives in the German plan of conquest lay in this sector, a particularly able signals office was transferred from the West, and put in charge of establishing and directing the intercept station.

In addition, the Chi-Stelle sent a cryptanalysis platoon of about 30 men to Athens, in order to obtain more intelligence on the RAF in the Mediterranean, by reconstructing the newly-changed codebook used in the 4-figure traffic. This unit was established in Loutsa. This resulted in an increase of solved messages.

As radio transmissions from Turkey fell into the area of skip, an intercept team with a small tactical evaluation section, established itself on the island of Kavala in the northern Aegean Sea.

- Signals platoon Africa

A signals platoon was taken from the 9th company to work with the newly formed Luftwaffe African Air Command. Its mission was the interception of air-support and RT traffic, and was very successful in cooperating with both the air and ground forces, but owing to the unsatisfactory signal communications facilities between Europe and Africa, the new and important procedures and processes were never brought to the timely attention of the corresponding evaluation section of other signals units.

- Referat C

===== Strength =====
Unit Strength
Unit	No. of Men
9th Company, LNR 40 in Kifissia	200
W-14	60
W0-313 in Sicily	27
Referat C	13
Total Personnel	300

===== Evaluation =====
Each of the signals units did their own evaluation of the intercepted traffic. The final evaluation of 9th Company LNR 40 was located with the intelligence operations of Fliegerkorps X.

At first, W-14 confined itself chiefly to an evaluation of the message contents, and the peculiarities of the different traffic, as most other units were doing at this time. After the arrival of the cryptanalysis platoon, the intercept of traffic was guided by two considerations:

1. to increase the total quantity of messages available through the interception of networks, not previously covered.
2. to intercept systematically traffic of tactical importance.

In those days, evaluation meant deciphering or solving a message and translating it into German. Every day a collection of solved messages was sent to Referat C and all other signals units in the south. All stations published daily technical intelligence reports on the results on evaluation, and monthly reports.

===== Signal communication =====
In contrast to the west, the south never had excellent wire communications. A direct line between Sicily and Berlin as well as between Athens and Berlin did exist, but even at the best of times, it was almost impossible to get through from Athens to Sicily. The non-existence of communications from east to west was the principal reason for the Referat moving back to Berlin from Paris. This Referat should have been even more important, as it was the only cypher bureau that received up to date information from both the eastern and western Mediterranean. Daily situation reports were sent to the Referat by those signals stations having the best teleprinter lines. The units in Sicily had their own internal wire net. When this facility was inadequate, flash messages and orders were sent by wireless telegraphy. Reports were sent by courier.

===== Liaison =====
From the beginning of the Norwegian campaign, the liaison between intelligence operations of Fliegerkorps X and the 9th Company supplying it with intelligence, was particularly close. This company's reports were not prepared by its evaluation section, but by intelligence operations. However, a general evolution in this direction would not have been advantageous to signals, as it would have lost its independence. The 9th Company was dependent on operations department to such an extent that operations, not the company commander, decided the units coverage. As W-14 and WO-313 also used to turn in their material to the operations Abteilung, and since the Referat was not alive to its responsibilities, the operations department of the Fliegerkorps alone could give a currently summary of the air situation in the Mediterranean theatre.

==== Mid 1942 ====
This diagram represents the organisation of a number of Luftwaffe High Frequency (HF) Direction-Finding (DF) baselines that were created by the Luftwaffe, that was in place in the eastern Mediterranean, in mid-1942. The HF DF network enabled the Luftwaffe to track Allied bombing raids in the Balkans, e.g. the Allied Liberator bombing attack on Ploiești that was sent to destroy the oil installations and infrastructure a year later on 1 July 1943

===== General =====
The strong reinforcement of the RAF, and the growth of opposition generally in the Mediterranean forced the German High Command to tremendously strengthen the Luftwaffe in that theatre. For that reason, Luftlotte 2 was withdrawn from the Eastern Front in November 1941 and sent to Sicily. At the beginning of 1942 it arrived in Taormina. The following units were assigned to it:

- Fliegerkorps II in Messina
- Fliegerkorps X in Heraklion
- African Air Command

Each Fliegerkorps had an attached signals company; the African Air Command had a signals platoon. An evaluation company W-Leit 2 was attached to the Luftflotte and became the centre of signals activities. By virtue of the expansion of the signals company in Athens, to which new personnel were constantly being added, the organisation was finally raised to the size and status of a battalion. This resulted in a distinct separation of signals organisation in the south. W-Leit 2 and its associated units became responsible for the area west of a line drawn through Capo Passero, Malta and Tripoli. W-Leit 2, Southeast was responsible for the area east of this line. The logical unification of the two battalions into one signals regiment was repeatedly considered, but failed due to bureaucracy.

===== Organisation =====
The great importance the Mediterranean Theatre had assumed by the middle of 1942 can be estimated from the fact that the number of personnel engaged in signals work had increased 500% over the previous year. An important step in the development of the signal service in the western Mediterranean was the transfer of W-Leit 2 from the Eastern Front to Taormina in Sicily.

- W-Leit 2

W-Leit 2 with its outstations was originally stationed in Brussels to monitor Britain during the first half of 1940. When it moved to the Mediterranean, following a short tour of Smolensk with Luftflotte 2, it continued intercepting RAF traffic. The previous task of monitoring the Russians was primitive compared to what was now required, and some time was needed for orientation. The evaluation unit for Luftwaffe 2 controlled all the other signal companies and platoons in the western Mediterranean. No single signals officer in a responsible position possessed the tactical perception to enable successful signals to work in the difficult theatre. So the battalion concentrated on air-to-ground traffic similar to the traffic intercepted on the Channel coast. However, the unit lacked a well-rounded signals intelligence program.

Intercept platoon W-Leit 2 collected the following types of traffic:

- Reconnaissance and safety service frequencies of Malta and Egypt.
- Torpedo-bombers, ferry and transport flights along the Gibraltar, Malta-Egypt route
- Air-Sea rescue, Navigational aids, including radio beacons and broadcast transmitters along with news reports.
- HF RT of the Malta fighter units and of aircraft carriers delivering fighters for the Maltese garrison, before British fighter units changed to VHF transmission in March 1942.

HF DF units in Marsala, Primosole and Portopalo di Capo Passero in Sicily and Gallipoli, were at the units disposal.

- 10th Company, LNR 2 in Syracuse

The 10th Company, LNR 2 was also transferred from Smolensk to Sicily at the beginning of 1942. It consisted of one strong WT platoon in Syracuse and a VHF platoon on a mountain located southeast of Noto. The WT platoon covered the Free French traffic from North Africa, the Malta-based reconnaissance traffic, and the other WT frequencies used by the RAF on Malta.

The outstation in Noto was activated in March 1942, to operate against the fighters on Malta, which in the meantime had gone over to VHF. It included RT operators who had come from the former VHF intercept stations of W-Leit 2 on the channel coast.

There was no VHF station in the whole of the Mediterranean whose site could approach the 10th Company in Noto and was considered to have excellent VHF RT operators. The restricted size of Malta enabled Allied operations to be covered in great detail. Moreover, all the VHF transmitters in Malta could be heard clearly in Noto, despite the efforts of the British forces to screen the transmissions. Also, the most attractive feature of VHF intercept operation here was the large number of sorties flown by the opposing air forces, who were matched against each other.

The outstation in Noto had a nearby VHF DF in Agrigento, and another in its own immediate vicinity. Collaboration with the Italian VHF station in Ragusa was considered one-sided, and limited virtually to a good-natured wining and dining of the Italian RT operators on temporary duty at German stations, who were inherently capable operators, but had no interest in the work.

- 9th Company, LNR 32 in Messina

This was the signals company of Fliegerkorps II, and shared its assignment with the 10th Company, LNR 2. The leadership of this company was poor.

- Signals Platoon Africa in Marble Arch

This platoon, which was located in the vicinity of the African Air Command, had a very elastic cover program. For example, during the day, fighter and medium bomber units were covered; at night 205 Bomber Group. The platoon was especially successful in monitoring air support traffic. Intelligence obtained from these networks was turned over immediately to the Air Commander, and very often put to tactical use.

Later, small teams were detached to German fighter units in Africa. Their mission was to inform the command posts of Allied fighter activity. They may be considered the forerunners of the Fighter Warning Service subsequently developed in the south. The platoon also employed a number of airborne RT operators, who accompanied reconnaissance and bomber crews on difficult missions.

The primary function of this signals platoon was to serve the tactical units in Africa. It was fully mobile, and so equipped with respect to personnel and radio kit that it could work completely independently. Work generally done by overhead personnel was performed by the radio operators themselves. The evaluation section was small in number. The radio operator on the receiver passed messages that were deemed important to the tactical units concerned.

- W-Leit, Southeast

The most astounding growth of any signals units was that of W-14 in Vouliagmeni, that expanded in the spring to Leitstelle, Southeast. This growth was substantially the personal accomplishment of one career signals officer.

W-14 was brought up to strength by drawing personnel from replacements pools. Then followed the incorporation of WO-313, which was not engaged in any specific or vital work. Accordingly, in the course of the year under discussion, W-14 increased its personnel nearly tenfold. In December 1941, the evaluation section moved from Vouliagmeni to Athens, and in April 1942 the large-scale installation in Loutsa was finally ready for operations, after indescribable difficulties with Luftwaffe construction engineers and Greek labour. After an inspection by General Wolfgang Martini, the over-expanded post was separated into two companies. The evaluation unit in Athens was made into a Leitstelle for the whole eastern Mediterranean and the Near East. It concentrated mainly on the clarification of Allied point-to-point traffic. The WT intercept station in Loutsa covered:

- Point-to-point networks of AHQ, Middle East Command, Desert Air Force, AHQ Iran to Iran, HQ. Aden, HQ. The Levant, as well as 201 NC Group and 205 Group
- Traffic of Allied transport in Africa

The DF stations in Loutsa, Constanța and Rhodes; stations in Kalamaki, Palaiochora, and Derna were subsequently added.

- 9th Company, LNR 40 in Kunawi on Crete

The work of this company during the previous year was confined to the requirements of Fliegerkorps X. Since in the meantime British traffic in the Mediterranean had increased to such an extent that one intercept company could no longer handle all the operational requirements, so the 9th Company, LNR was placed operationally under the command of W-Leit, Southeast, and received its coverage assignments from this station. The company further specialised in RT intercept. It established HF and VHF outstations on Crete and Rhodes, in the Gulf of Bomba and in Derna. The outstations in western Crete covered RT in Cyrenaica, Egypt, and Palestine and from the aircraft carrier units in the waters surrounding the unit. The outstation on Rhodes covered the fighters on Cyprus and the Levant. Those in the Gulf of Bomba and in Derna mostly served Nachtjagdgeschwader 2, that was operating against 205 Bomber Group.

- The Radar Intercept Company, Mediterranean

Similar to those on the channel coast, stations were set up on Crete, at that time for the interception and jamming Allied airborne and ground radar. An experimental Junkers Ju 52 was specially fitted out to jam Allied radar in the Malta area, but the results were modest and failed to get support by the Luftwaffe.

- Conclusions

Taken as a whole, the characteristics of transition can be recognised in the signals organisation in the Mediterranean during this period. All companies, except the intercept company in Loutsa, had an overlap in functionality, specifically the traffic type they intercepted, in order to give flash reports to the operational units they were subordinated to. Despite the two Leitstellen, there was no unified framework that signals operations worked under. Nor could Referat C influence operations in this respect, being too far away.

===== Strength =====
Unit strength
Unit	No. of Men
W-Leit 2 including intercept platoon	250
10th Company, LNR 2	200
9th Company, LNR 32	100
W-Leit, Southeast, including cryptanalysis platoon	350
WT company in Loutsa	200
9th Company, LNR 40	200
Signals Platoon, Africa	50
Radar Intercept company	80
Referat C	30
Total Personnel	1460

===== Evaluation =====
The Leitstellen were provided to perform the evaluation function. But as the signals companies were given considerable assistance by the headquarters for which they worked, they prepared independent monthly reports for these HQs, in addition to supplying daily reports and flash messages. Still the two Leitstellen succeeded in retaining the final analysis function for themselves, and made the companies confine themselves more and more to instant tactical evaluation.

The development of evaluation itself was marked by:

- The preference among intercept units for air-to-ground traffic;
- The successes of cryptanalysis on point-to-point traffic. In this respect, evaluation in the south surpassed that in the west; whereas the latter had to content itself with traffic and log analysis, the former by solving messages, knew the unit designation, equipment and strength of personnel, and could incorporate this knowledge into the rest of their intelligence work. The combination of air-to-ground traffic intercepts and solved WT messages, provided significant identifications.

The division of work between the two Leitstellen in the south was fixed by the differences in the traffic that each covered. The evaluation section in W-Leit southeast was organised on the basis of the opponents units with each section handling a tactical unit, e.g. No. 201 Group RAF, No. 205 Group RAF, 9th Air Force and the Desert Air Force. By way of contrast, W-Leit 2 divided its evaluation according to the source of the information, e.g. fighter RT, reconnaissance, bomber WT and air support traffic. In addition to these sections, there were additional evaluation sections for DF and captured documents. This division developed a high degree of specialisation; but in the case of W-Leit 2, whose officers were rather inefficient, led to an undesirable aloofness, which had an adverse effect not only on cooperation, within the W-Leit, but also on the outstations working under its direction.

Analysis of the 4-figure messages that were intercepted from point-to-point networks supplied excellent intelligence on the strength, order of battle, equipment and operations of Allied air units. Evaluation of this traffic was in large measure responsible for the rapid increase in the importance of W-Leit, Southeast. The combining of the intelligence gained through this source with air-to-ground traffic, provided a thorough picture of the air situation.

Beginning in June 1941, the transport traffic was also worked on by the contents evaluation section. These transport messages acquired additional importance the following year.

The 9th Company LNR 40 evaluation section was awarded a degree of independence due to the unreliable communications between Crete and the mainland. The evaluation section, that worked on the intelligence operations of the Fliegerkorps, was transferred back to the company in December 1941.

===== Signal communication =====
In order to derive operational benefit from the flash reports, both the operational units and the Signal Intelligence Service (signals) demanded that the latter have its own wire nets. The passing on of the daily signals reports, summaries, memoranda or signals matters, the exchange of cryptanalytic material, soon all necessitated a reliable and secure network specificity for the service. These requirements were agreed to by higher head headquarters, and in 1942, the communication facilities consisted of:

- Wire communication

Teleprinter lines between Taormina and Berlin, Athens and Berlin as well as between signals battalions. Telephone lines from each battalion to Referat C in Berlin, to Luftflotte 2 and subordinate units; between the individual signals units.

- Radio communication

- The Chi-Stelle network which included both Leitstellen.
- A signals network including all signals units in the Mediterranean
- Battalion networks including companies and outstations.

The wired network in Sicily was dependable and was used almost exclusively for intelligence. Only in the Balkans, with its permanent unrest, did radio communication prove indispensable from the start, with radio procedures and discipline optimised for the conditions.

Between the Chi-Stelle and the battalions, almost all communication was by land-line, as the Luftwaffe cypher device provided for radio communication was not suitable for encrypting the usual long reports, e.g. daily tactical reports, without a large number of additional message centre personnel.

===== Liaison =====
Even the smallest piece of intelligence, that signals were able to obtain from Allied air forces, soon made signals indefensible to the other units and headquarters in the south, where in extended areas relatively small forces opposed each other. The reliability of signals engendered great trust in it, and therefore, demand in combat units for signals liaison officers continually increased. Signals liaison officers were assigned to the Luftflotte, the Fliegerkorps and to the African Air Command. They made their reports to the intelligence or operations departments of the units, and particularly important messages were forwarded to the commanding generals.

Combat units commanders were briefed on the offensive and defensive possibilities of signals intelligence. Those who planned operations depended on the performance of signals that certain forces were held in reserve, especially in the Italian sector, which was only committed on the basis of signals reports. In addition to the fighters, whose control would have been impossible without the intelligence picture of the air situation provided by signals, bomber groups were also grateful for the signals fighter warning service, at that time based mostly on RT interception that enabled them to keep their losses tolerably low.

The liaison officer was the signals representative at headquarters. The officer received flash reports forwarded by teleprinter from intercept companies and the evaluation section and brought them to the attention of command, explaining the air situation at the daily conferences in the military intelligence office. The liaison officers were included in the distribution of all tactical reports. Technical signal data, e.g. call signs, were only passed on to them in exceptional cases. By virtue of their position, signals liaison officers exercised a considerable influence on tactical evaluation. At the same time, they were responsible for the process that ensures signals units received captured documents, PWI reports, photograph intelligence, and other military intelligence material, while passing to signals the particular requests of the combat units.

==== Mid 1943 ====
===== General =====
In the year between 1942 and 1943, a rapid decline in military fortunes in the Mediterranean had occurred for Germany. Erwin Rommel's victories during 1941–1942 had brought the German forces close to Egypt. The turning points were the Second Battle of El Alamein and Field marshal Harold Alexander breakthrough at El Alamein and the Allied landings in French North Africa.

- Eastern Mediterranean

One of the greatest successes of signals in the Mediterranean was the thorough monitoring of the Allied ferry service over the desert stretch from Sekondi-Takoradi to Accra to the Egyptian front via Khartoum, as well as from the UK via Gibraltar to Africa. For months on end, the German High Command was furnished precise information as to the number and types of ferried aircraft, length of the flights, intermediate landing fields, and the capabilities of the individual supply routes. The intercepted material sufficed to calculate the Allied air potential for months in advance. Whether the German operational commands lacked the tactical ability to appreciate the importance of this intelligence, or whether their default in moral courage in the face of dependence on the plans of a single individual was so abject that they simply disregarded these possibilities, at any rate, the signals were exonerated of any responsibly for the collapse of the front at El Alamein and the retreat that followed. The opposition was shown by the Luftwaffe military intelligence towards the reports the Chi-Stelle furnished, whenever these reports exceeded the limits of a tactical nature. Military intelligence reserved to itself the exclusive rights to draw conclusions from a given situation. The Referat directors in the south and west were accustomed to facing a controversy every time they turned in a report because military intelligence could always find the statements within the report so overwhelming, that it did not dare report these startling facts before German General Staff. Thus the most complete signal intelligence situation summary was of no avail if the General Staff failed to adjust its plans to the realities of the situation.

- Allied Landings in North Africa

Although Luftwaffe signals unquestionably had fulfilled its function, it failed to predict the most decisive event of this period in the western Mediterranean, the Allied landings in North Africa. Although responsibility for strategic planning in the entire southern area lay with Luftflotte 2 in Sicily, its signals battalion performed only part of the mission assigned to it. While in the eastern Mediterranean, a start had been made in the right direction, that only a thorough monitoring of the opponents point-to-point traffic could guarantee a reliable appreciation of his organisation, W-Leit 2, on the other hand, worked on the monitoring of air-to-ground traffic, without assigning even one of their companies the task of monitoring the vast extent of the French North African coast. This task was carried out by a fixed station in Oberhaching, Bavaria. The position of Referat C was not sufficiently strong when opposed by the powerful battalion, under the command of the General Staff South, to be able to interfere in the details of the battalion operations. Cooperation was lacking in the German Command since the threat of the landings in French North Africa was known by Pers Z S, but the other cypher bureaus of the armed forces in Berlin were not informed of the situation.

Two conditions greatly favoured this Allied undertaking:

- The landing operations in North Africa were the first of their kind, therefore the Wehrmacht possessed no experience in methods by which they might have been pre-determined.
- As became known later, the allied point-to-point networks offered the only reliable means of predicting a landing. In the case of French North Africa, these were either covered by signals or neglected entirely.

The Allied landings in North Africa was the most successful use of deception of the entire war. The plan of making the landings appear to be no more than a large group of the usual convoy was considered masterful by Chi-Stelle. The activities of the diplomat Robert Daniel Murphy and his consuls in North Africa escaped German political notice as did the increased reconnaissance of the West African coast by Gibraltar-based aircraft. Murphy's activity was discussed at length in the German press at the time, but no military conclusions were drawn. Thus the only available clue that remained, the increase in aerial reconnaissance from Gibraltar, Freetown and Bathurst, was interpreted as signifying the approach of several large convoys for the Cyrenaican front. Reconnaissance over the African mainland was presumably carried out by carrier-based aircraft. However, no data on the RT traffic was procured by Luftwaffe signals, since it had no adequate bases for the interception of this traffic. The installation of a VHF detachment in the Balearic Islands had been requested by RT specialists, but this had never materialised.

During the year, the signals south unit was expanded significantly. Its defensive functions assumed increasing importance. This development always took place when:

- Command must rely on passive defence measures against Allied raids because they lack the power of the offensive.
- Signals must take up the slack, owing to the deficiency of intelligence from other sources.

At the time developments in the Mediterranean was characterised by:

- The unsuccessful attempt to create a unified signals organisation in the south.
- Accelerated construction of intercept and DF stations for VHF RT and radar intercept.
- Increase to the size of signals platoon to a company.
- The beginning of a flight path tracking unit in the south.

===== Organisation =====
The German strategy in the south was driven by defeats and a steady accretion of personnel, moving from an offensive to defensive pose, and this dictated a more centralised signals organisation in the south, similar in design to the west, where that unit had reorganised in the middle of 1942. During the past year, the intercept companies had lost the last vestige of independence from the Leitststellen, and thus became more an intercept instrument of the evaluation company at battalion headquarters. Then a consolidation of the different types of evaluation executed by W-Leit 2 and W-Leit, Southeast, in relation to a higher command of intelligence evaluation, became urgent. To an increasing extent, the Chi-Stelle discharged its services to Luftwaffe General Staff, but its output was little used to furnish the service to the Officer in charge, W-Leit, Southeast. The obvious remedy was to unite the two battalions into a signals regiment. Instead, a signals liaison unit was assigned to Luftflotte 2 at the end of 1942.

- Signals liaison unit

This unit was considered a dud, it had no qualified officer who might have been able to command the team effectively and had an unsound signals policy with respect to the assignment of personnel. The unit's mission was intended to be a compilation of the results of signals evaluation, and to establish a liaison between the Chi-Stelle in Berlin and with Luftwaffe commands in Italy and Greece. This was considered an illusion, as the unit did not claim a single competent officer. Neglected by Chi-Stelle and ignored by the Leitstellen, it continued for six months and was reorganised.

- Referat C

In contrast, Referat C began to become more the professional cypher bureau it needed to be, particularly by the summer of 1942, when the Referat B director was transferred back to the Marstall, took over Referat C, and increased its workload. Referat C personnel were for the most part inexperienced, who were instructed in the work and its purpose. New methods were developed to utilise the results of the point-to-point intercept of traffic by W-Leit, Southeast, and the air-to-ground monitoring traffic for W-Leit 2, for final evaluation. Also, there evolved a close collaboration with Central Staff, which became more interested in the work of this Referat. The Referat by turn, attained increasing influence over the two Leitstellen, even though they were considered autonomous considering the great distances involved. Nevertheless, the Referat remained in control of the assignment of missions to the signals battalions, and when problems occurred, a specialist consultant was sent to the Leitstelle concerned to adjust matters.

The best performance by the Referat was regarding log analysis and was considered to have an excellent section for monthly reporting writing of the press to military intelligence, and prisoner of war interrogations. The analysis of navigational aids remained undeveloped, as no technical people were available.

- W-Leit 2

The officers of W-Leit 2 were incompetent and old, technically and tactically outmoded reserve officers, ignorant of the signals services, and uninterested in its requirements, and this led towards the failure of W-Leit 2 to realise its full capabilities. Any action by the unit was almost never the result of prudent planning but dictated by the allied or German High Command. Under these circumstances and during the period in question, many VHF and radar intercept stations were established. These outstations deserve the credit for the success of Luftwaffe signals in the western Mediterranean. They thoroughly covered the supply route between Sicily and Africa, and attempted to protect the increasingly imperilled line of communication with the German African Army located in Tunisia.

This diagram represents the organisation of a number of Luftwaffe High Frequency (HF) Direction-Finding (DF) units of W-Leit 2, that were in place in the eastern Mediterranean, at the beginning of 1943. Note the large geographical distribution of the units, designed to give advanced warning of bomber attacks on Italy and Balkans

Radar intercept stations were erected in Gallipoli, Santa Maria di Leuca, Melito, Ustica, Cagliari, Marsala, Trapani, Augusta, Portopalo, Noto, Gela, Pantelleria, Cape Bon, Porto Bardia and El Daba. Some of the radar intercept stations were equipped with jamming transmitters, and by jamming the airborne surface vessel and naval radars, they endeavoured to protect the supply routes necessary to maintain the Panzer armies [FIG 4].

For VHF RT traffic, in addition to the station at Noto, intercept and DF stations were set up on Mt Erice near Trapani, in El Aouina in Tunisia and in Teulada in Sardinia.

The RT operators of Signals Company, Africa, equipped with Victor Army Receivers (VHF), flew with the Geschwader commanders, and during serial battles kept them informed of the opponents intentions on the basis of intercepted RT traffic. With the capitulation of Vichy Tunisia (Tunisian Campaign), in May 1943, half of the signals company was taken prisoner.

- W-Leit, Southeast

During the period between summer 1942 and spring 1932, the signals organisation in the eastern Mediterranean suffered the same lack of orientation as prevailed in the western Mediterranean, due to the disastrous internal politics of the service. Not until February 1943, with the advent of a new officer, did the battalion start to improve. From then on the Signals unit in the eastern Mediterranean began to recover the ground it had lost. When Luftflotte, Southeast was formed, it was supported in every conceivable way by Luftflotte Commander, General Martin Fiebig, as well as by his Signal Officer.

In the Southeast, and more so than anywhere else, the superiority of Allied radio techniques was recognised, and monitoring operations were of necessity shaped accordingly. Whereas in the west, and in the Sicily, Tunisia sector, the radar intercept service developed independently of the signals intelligence service, and in consequence the results radar interception never received the fullest tactical exploitation. Thus from the beginning, signals had the results of radar intercept at its disposal, and the latter service could avail itself of a highly developed communication system. Considering that this theatre of war was of secondary importance and that therefore the battalion was provided with relatively modest facilities, even compared to W-Leit 2, the battalion's performance was superb.

This diagram represents the organisation of a number of Luftwaffe Medium Frequency (MF) and High Frequency (HF) Direction-Finding (DF) baselines that were created by the Luftwaffe and placed in the eastern Mediterranean, in the autumn of 1943

9th Company, LNR 40 was assigned to the battalion, eliminating the last independent signals company in the Mediterranean. The battalion also supervised the work of the radar intercept company in Crete and incorporated the latter's evaluation section into its own. Even the Kriegsmarine placed its radar intercept stations, that were scattered throughout the Aegean islands, under the supervision of Luftwaffe signals in the southeast.

The expansion of the signals battalion continued by extending the HF DF network to include new stations in Premstätten, Tirana and Oberhaching. [Fig 5].

In order to locate Allied radio beacons and navigational aids, an HF DF network was established between Pancevo, Sedes, Kalamaki and Tirana. It performed a valuable service in confirming movements of American units, as they would take their radio beacons with them when their units moved and established themselves somewhere else without changing the recognition signal.

Changes in the disposition of the Turkish Air Force considerably reduced the amount of reception of RT by the intercept station at Kavala, that had been monitoring Turkey. Therefore, after several intermediate moves, the intercept platoon was finally transferred to Constanța. A total of 10 HF receivers were used to monitor the network of the Turkish High Command, individual air brigade networks and the police and naval traffic.

During the course of 1942, the British had re-equipped almost all their fighters in the eastern Mediterranean with VHF. Therefore, the organisation of the fighter warning service in the area was eminently unsuitable for VHF interception, as the average distance between the R/T platoons and the Allied control stations was a matter 700 to 1200 kilometres. That proved a difficult problem. The technicians declared it incapable of solution. Site reconnaissance teams, which did not permit themselves to be diverted by the reasoning of the technicians, proceeded to experiment on the mountains of Crete and Rhodes, and depending on weather conditions achieved some surprising results.

- 10th Company LNR 3

Before the Allied landing in North Africa, a signals company that had formerly covered the Royal Air Force point-to-point networks in the UK, was transferred to southern Lorraine to monitor Vichy France traffic. After Vichy France was occupied by German troops, this intercept company moved to Montpellier, where it took over a share of the coverage of the eastern Mediterranean. A special significance was accorded its work when units of Mediterranean Allied Coastal Air Force (MACAF) and Mediterranean Allied Tactical Air Force moved to Sardinia and Corsica, and the airfields in southern Sardinia, especially Decimomannu, became of decisive importance to the supply route of Southern Italy. In addition to air-to-ground traffic, the intercept company also covered the point-to-point networks in North Africa.

===== Strength =====
Unit Strength
Unit	No. of Men
Referat C	50
W-Leit 2, evaluation company	200
3 intercept companies	600
1 radar intercept company	200
10th company, LNR 3	200
W-Leit Southeast, evaluation company	200
3 intercept companies	600
1 radar intercept company	200
Total Personnel	2250

===== Evaluation =====
A systematic improvement was possible only in the case of W-Leit Southeast, as W-Leit 2 was suffering from a lack of competent leadership at the time.

Evaluation of W-Leit 2 was still based on sources of intelligence, which not only lacked a coordinating factor, i.e. a final evaluation agency, but too long was allowed to elapse before new types of evaluation, such as that of the VHF traffic of American heavy bomber units, was undertaken. On the contrary, however, W-Leit 2 achieved noteworthy success in its evaluation of air support traffic in the North African theatre, in which field it was a leader.

Evaluation at W-Leit Southeast had progressed along the following lines during the year 1943.

- After November 1942, Change-over to mere traffic and log analysis, after the 4-figure code could no longer be solved.
- Evaluation of air raid warning and radar networks.
- Beginning of flight path tracking
- Increase the importance of radar intercept evaluation

As the solving of British 4-Figure traffic had become more and more difficult after November 1942, this task was turned over to Referat E of the Chi-Stelle in Potsdam. Therefore, the cryptanalysis platoon of W-Leit Southeast, returned to the Chi-Stelle. From this time forward, W-Leit Southeast evaluated the point-to-point traffic exclusively from its general characteristics. This was facilitated by the experienced log analysis section, where call signs and frequencies were identified on the basis of the cryptanalysis work that had been completed months before. Based upon this detailed knowledge, changes in call signs and frequencies did not confuse the signal intelligence picture, once they had been determined. When cryptanalysis was no longer possible, organisation and order of battle of Allied air forces in the Mediterranean were reconstructed from the monitoring of point-to-point traffic, while tactics, equipment and strength, hereafter were obtained from air-to-ground traffic.

By identifying the traffic of the Allied air raid warning and radar organisations in Africa, the evaluation section was able to open a new field of intelligence, that greatly supplemented the results of air-to-ground monitoring. Air-to-ground traffic and air raid warning messages formed the basis for flight path tracking in the Southeast.

The oldest source of intelligence for flight path tracking was WT air-to-ground traffic. Direction-Finding plotting made this possible. Its true importance became fully apparent at the time of the first B-24 Liberator raid on Ploiești. The WT traffic of the Liberators, that was especially voluminous during the return flight, was DF'd during the whole raid, with the result that landings of individual aircraft in Turkey, Cyprus, The Levant and Malta could be precisely determined.

Another source of flight tracking was the decoding of messages from Allied air raid warning networks in Cyrenaica. The approach flight of the heavy bombers units, on their way to targets in Italy and Greece, was invariably reported to tactical headquarters, either Luftflotte 2, Fliegerkorps II or Fliegerkorps X. By this system of early warning, a great number of aircraft were shot down on several occasions.

Later on, a much more productive and exact method of locating aircraft formations by evaluating the Allied radar networks, which reported every movement of Allied aircraft within range. In this manner, the evaluation section could determine the exact location and strength of the opponent's formations, and the method used to control them. Just as important to the German Commands early warning was the question of whether there would be an Allied raid or not. Signals could also predict this on the basis of tuning traffic from Allied bombers.

W-Leit 3 was superior to W-Leit Southeast in the evaluation of very high frequency (VHF) RT traffic, owing to the more favourable location of its out-stations. The latter had neither advantageously sited out-stations, nor adequately trained RT operators. Both lacked trained radar operators with a technical background. In order to remedy this deficiency, personnel were continually sent to training courses, as well as receiving training within the battalion. The radar intercept evaluation section relied on personnel who were experienced in various fields of analysis.

===== Signal communication =====
- With the Chi-Stelle

Each day, both signals battalions sent a daily report by teleprinter to Referat C in Potsdam. This report comprised both a tactical and technical section. Teleprinter was the most practical means of communication between the Referat and the signals battalions. The telephone lines were subject to interference and were frequently down. Radio was seldom used and then only for short reports. Owing to its good landline communication with the east and west, the Chi-Stelle was addicted to the use of wire.

- Within the two signals battalions.

W-Leit Southeast was superior to W-Leit 2 in matters of communications as well, despite the greater distances involved, and the partisan activities in the Balkans. In Sicily communication depended principally on the excellent German wire network, even though towards the end of the period under discussion, the Italians committed more and more acts of sabotage, Voice frequency communication, i.e. carrier frequency channels with radio links, were set up between Africa and Sicily, and the European mainland.

Land-line communication did not play much of a part within W-Leit Southeast. Communication with companies and outstations was largely by means of Wireless telegraphy. For the transmission of flash reports, cypher tables, changes at regular intervals were used. Remaining traffic was enciphered by the Enigma machine that was distributed down to individual companies and detachments.

Heinrich settings were used in the Enigma machine. These were used exclusively with Luftwaffe signals intelligence and were changed daily. Moreover, both battalions set up their own Wireless Telegraphy communication systems for passing radar intercept reports, in which different out-stations were included in networks arranged on a geographic rather than a conventional administrative basis.

===== Liaison =====
The combat units were so accustomed to the monthly reports of the signals battalions, with their strategic intelligence on the Allied organisation, an order of battle, equipment, tactics and strength, that they were inclined to take these reports for granted. Only when early warning of impending heavy bomber raids enabled the combat units to score new successes, did the prestige of signals attain its former eminent status.

For political reasons collaboration with the Italian signal's intelligence bureau was being ordered by Senior Command. Nevertheless, because of the distrust on the part of the German signals bureau, it was limited to exchanges of unimportant material. The results of the evaluation were communicated to the Italian cypher agency Servizio Informazioni Militare via Brigadier General Vittorio Gamba, it was limited to an exchange of unimportant material. The results of the evaluation were communicated to the Italian agency only with the greatest caution. The Italian cypher agency, Servizio Informazioni Militare, was considered by the Luftwaffe to be a purely amateur undertaking, and especially in the field of evaluation, remained in its embryonic stages.

Cooperation with the German Army cypher bureau, the General der Nachrichtenaufklärung and the German Navy, B-Dienst proved excellent, although their remit was radically different. It was consolidated by personal contacts between the individual specialists. All relevant information of interest to other departments of the Wehrmacht was immediately telephoned to them and later confirmed by teleprinter. The corresponding Army and Navy officers were also put on the distribution list to receive the monthly reports of both signals battalions.

===== Miscellaneous =====
- Landing of the Allies in North Africa

For some time prior to the landing, there was an unusual increase in the radio traffic. Signals intercepted traffic from a number of reconnaissance aircraft seen over the Atlantic and the western Mediterranean Sea. The missions flown by Gibraltar reconnaissance aircraft were doubled. The massing of naval units in Gibraltar harbour was equally visible to German intelligence. However, the conclusion drawn from these phenomena was mere to the effect that no major supply convoy from the Atlantic into the Mediterranean was impending. Thus the German High Command was taken completely by surprise when the landings occurred on 8 November 1942. Luftwaffe signals in the western Mediterranean was the least prepared of all. Not until three days after the event did W-Leit 2, on being pressed by Chi-Stelle, send in some logs of traffic between fighters and carriers in the Algiers area, copied by airborne WT operators. A mixed WT and RT team signals company in Sicily was immediately sent to Elmas in Sardinia, and an intercept platoon joined the first German soldiers in Tunisia. The 10th Co. LNR 3 was transferred from central France to Montpellier. Thus the coverage of the enormous area was gradually organised, with particularly good results being obtained by monitoring the abundant air support networks. In this traffic, the Allies gave notice of their intended operations and so far in advance, that the German were usually able to take very complete countermeasures or passive defence steps.

- First attack on Ploiești

After the lull in operations lasting three or four weeks, on the 1 July 1943, the oil centre of Ploiești was attacked by 130–140 Liberators of the IX Bomber Command. For training purposes, the American had built a model of the Ploiești oil district, in the east of Benghazi where bomber crews practised for their first big mission. These rehearsals which lasted several weeks were followed closely by Luftwaffe signals, so therefore the German High Command knew that some unusual mission by heavy bombers was to be expected. On 28 June 1943 training ceased. When on 1 July 1943 at 0700 hours the ground station 9KW for the X Bomber Command began transmitting, German High Command was certain that there would be a deep penetration bombing raid. Early that morning 9KW transmitted more tuning messages. The beginning of the flight of the Liberators bomber formation was then reflected in the messages of Allied radar networks. At first, the usual regular course of the bombers towards Italy was maintained before the unit turned east at Lake Ohrid at which point the unit flew a northeast course to Ploiești.

From 0700 hours onwards, the whole southeast section was in a state of alert. The oil region was put under a smoke screen cover and the local fighter defence was reinforced by fighter aircraft from Munich, Vienna and Italy. This was not considered an unusual act since both Jagddivision 7 and Jagddivision 8, as well as the Upper Italy Fighter Command, were accustomed to redeploying their fighter aircraft to threatened areas upon warning from the Luftwaffe signals. The German Air Raid Warning Service had been able to follow the approach of the Liberators over the Balkans, with some gaps in the course. The accumulation of fighters over the target soon succeeded in breaking up the bomber formations and inflicting heavy losses. The return to base was even more catastrophic for the bombers. The WT that filled the ether, throwing aside all rules of procedure, was telling testimony of this fact. One SOS followed another. The majority of the aircraft flew a direct course home to Benghazi. Five to seven Liberators landed in Cyprus. A number of others landed in Turkey and Malta. The German fighter arm that had been alerted throughout the entire Balkans, inflicted continuous losses on the homeward bound bomber formations, with the Luftwaffe fighters on Crete destroying four Liberators. Luftwaffe signals confirmed the loss of 75 Allied bombers.

- Prisoner of War interrogations in the south

Interrogation of Allied air prisoners of war in the south, especially in the early days, took place at higher headquarters without Luftwaffe signals participation. Later the prisoners were transported to the Dulag Luft. Prisoner of war reports reached Chi-Stelle for evaluation weeks later and were frequently obsolete. Signal stations were forbidden to conduct interrogations. Nevertheless, in some cases, commanders of outstations were able to participate in interrogations by virtue of their close liaison with the local air commanders. In this way, they were often able to effect a quick solution to current problems. It frequently happened that the signals officers who had a comprehensive knowledge of the Allied radio traffic, obtained especially good results. This was particularly true of crews that were interrogated directly after an aircraft had been shot down, or made an emergency landing. Thus it was that an officer of W-Leit 2 in Sicily was able to startle a British pilot who was so completely dazed by his misadventure by accosting him with his RT call-sign Tiger-Leader and pressing the advantage gained by this surprise, elicited an expansive statement.

The value of the interrogations conducted at the theatre headquarters in Taormina where W-Leit 2 participated, was most dubious because of the presence of Italian liaison officers. The clumsy procedure whereby each question and the answer had to be interpreted into three languages allowed the prisoners more time for consideration. A solution satisfactory to all parties was found only after the Italian surrender when a German PWI centre in Verona conducted interrogations of this type independently.

From the very start, the signals battalions sent a monthly report to this new interrogation centre, submitting its special requests. In certain cases evaluators were sent to Verona for a days visit. This procedure proved so satisfactory that a linguist officer of the battalion was permanently detailed to this task. He was informed of the later intelligence developments on a daily basis by telephone and of special requests and questions that were to be submitted. Supported by this intimate contact with Luftwaffe signals, the interrogations resulted not only in confirmation of the previous intelligence, but also hints that often opened the way forward to new information that could be of value to signals.

==== Development in the South August 1943 to October 1944 ====
===== General =====
Owing to the difference in the military situation between Italy and the Balkans, development of the two signals battalions continued to expand in separate directions. First Pietro Badoglio Proclamation reduced Italy in the eyes of German to an outpost of Fortress Germany. This meant that the Luftwaffe no longer protected Italian cities, holding all fighters for the defence of Germany. This weakening of active fighter command brought an increasing demand for signals intelligence to guide passive air defence.

W-Leit 2 was charged with the duty of following the developments in the front that was forming against the German forces in Italy and the operations concerned with supplying it. This battalion shared the coverage of the western Mediterranean, Allied transmissions, supply traffic with 10th Co. LNR 3. After the occupation of Corsica in November 1942 by Italian and German forces, W-Leit 2 forwarded a very high frequency (VHF) intercept platoon to Mont Agel to monitor Mediterranean Allied Tactical Air Force (MATAF) fighters operating from the airfields in northern Corsica.

From the time that the Allied forces landed in southern Italy, W-Leit Southeast took over coverage of the Adriatic whose coast was equally endangered by the threat of invasion. At the end of this period, the signals W-Leit Southeast company reached its maximum size and absorbed the signals company in Constanța, that was monitoring the Russian Black Sea Air Force. Also during this period, W-Leit Southeast prepared bases within the confines of greater Germany to which it might retire when the battlefront called for such a step. A change took place in the Luftwaffe organisation in the Balkans when Fliegerkorps X moved from Athens to France. In the spring of 1943, all Luftwaffe units stationed in the Balkans were assigned to Luftflotte Southeast.

Both battalions continued to provide flight path tracking of the Allied bomber missions that had moved to Foggia. The monitoring of these same Allied units became a principal function of Luftwaffe signals in the south. Despite unfavourable working conditions in the Balkans, a shortage of receiving sets, and a high proportion of second-rate personnel, W-Leit Southeast worked as efficiently and as performant as possible, due to what was considered, excellent leadership.

The organisation development of Luftwaffe signals in the south culminated in the consolidation of both signals battalions into one signals regiment with the regimental command being assigned to Ferdinand Feichtner.

===== Organisation =====
The combined Allied landings in Sicily and Italy on 9–10 July 1943, the increasingly untenable position of German forces in the Balkans, and the defection of Romania and breakthrough of Russian forces into this territory in September 1944, were all factors that determined the organisation and disposition of Luftwaffe signals in the south. Each of the battalions assumed a distinct and special development moulded by events in their respective sectors.

- W-Leit 2 (See Figures No. 7 and 8)

The diagram represents an organisational withdrawal of Luftwaffe signals units in the Western Mediterranean, July 1943 to May 1945. After the fall of Africa, Luftwaffe signals units retreated as the Allies gained ground. The retreat started after Tunisia was captured by the Allies in May 1943, followed by Sicily in August 1943. The Luftwaffe removed critical DF, radar and intercept out-station equipment first from Tunisia to Frascati, and then from Frascati to Padua, as the war progressed. Frascati was the regional headquarters of Albert Kesselring before being moved to Padua and then Canazei. Equipment and personnel who could not be carried by aeroplane travelled up the west coast of Italy, to a troop assembly area at Cosenza, where they reorganised before heading north.

After the loss of Africa and the systematic conquest of the islands surrounding Sicily, a landing in Sicily seemed only a matter of weeks away. As early as June 1943, all the women auxiliaries of W-Leit 2 were returned to Germany. Three days before the landing on 9 July 1943, the evaluation company was transferred mostly by air, from Taormina to Frascati, while 10th Co. LNR 2 moved into the installations in Taormina that were already vacated. The remaining signals units and outstations received their movement orders in ample time to move from Messina to Reggio Calabria under cover of a gigantic flak barrage. First they assembled in the Luftwaffe Signal Corps assembly area at Cosenza and then moved in stages to Frascati except for one large VHF platoon that took up position in Terelle.

Hence the battalion was taken unawares by the Italian armistice on 3 September 1943. The land-line communication with Germany was so badly mauled by the Allied bombing attacks on the Alpine passes, that the German command had to rely on Allied air support messages intercepted in Southern France to keep informed of the ground situation in Italy. On 8 December 1943, Frascati was bombed by about 170 B-24 bombers, causing 6000 fatalities including 36 members of the former Luftwaffe signals company, Africa. The battalion had already configured 66 HF receivers in Frascati. Now it moved north to Padua, where it created a large HF intercept station, with all key positions filled by a new group of officers.

For two months the signals battalion had virtually ceased operations. Only the VHF platoon and a few radar intercept stations remained in operation and furnished the combat units the indispensable flash reports.

After the move to the Padua area, a radical reorganisation took place. First, the evaluation company was overhauled completely, so that it could cope with all tactical requirements. Then a large HF intercept installation was established in the Padua area, that was the most modern of its kind. The number of its receivers increased to about 100 sets. A very large DF section was added. The 10th Co. LNR 2 devoted itself exclusively to DF, while the now reinforced signals company, Africa took over all HF interception. The 9th Co. LNR 32 with its VHF and radar intercept out-stations remained with Air Command, Italy, in Soriano, so that this headquarters possessed a complete signals unit exclusively for its own purposes, in its own area. This solution was arrived at in view of the constant difficulties with signal communication since the Italian armistice and proved extremely satisfactory. The 9th Co. LNR 32 specialised in monitoring the tactical air forces and the air support networks. Its work benefited not only the Luftwaffe but was at the same time vitally important to the German divisions on the Italian front.

Another task of the battalion was the interception of the traffic of the medium bombers, which constantly harassed the roads and railways of central and northern Italy, operating from bases in southern Sardinia. W-Leit 2 exceeded its commitment for the Italian theatre by contributing to the flight path tracking of the heavy bombers from airfields in the Foggia area. For this purpose, two girdles of RT outstations were set up in Italy. Since the bomber formation of the Nineteenth Air Force generally divulged their takeoff on HF RT transmissions, especially during the first months of their activity, and the nearest team intercepting this traffic of low signal strength was only 30 kilometres behind the front lines, this constituted the first reliable source of early warning. The first girdle of RT out-stations comprised VHF RT detachments in the environs of Genoa, Leghorn and Monte Venda. The second consisted of detachments on the Futa Pass. The RT platoon sited on Mont Agel covered VHF traffic from Corsica, insofar as it was concerned with operations against the south of France. When central Italy was attacked, the out-station in Portofino maintained intercept coverage.

After the change in leadership in Italy, the battalion recovered rapidly. The warning service, developed from the monitoring of Allied air support and radar networks, as well as from RT traffic, was of decisive importance to the German Army in Italy. Its monthly reports were exemplary for their intelligence co-relation of material and thorough interpretation. Both battalions competed with each other in flight path tracking. After the monitoring of Africa lost its importance, the intercept sites of W-Leit Southeast, proved better than those of W-Leit 2. However, the latter still had more experienced personnel. In the field of radar intercept, W-Leit Southeast still remained supreme. Indeed, towards the end of 1943, the radar intercept section of W-Leit 2 was dissolved as such, though the company continued as a unit function. Radar intercept never achieved the significance in the western Mediterranean that it did in the Balkans, largely for the reason that qualified specialists were never available to the former.

After the Allies broke into the eastern extremity of the Po Valley in September 1944, the battalion together with its evaluation company and an intercept company, moved to Canazei, while both its companies with its outstations remained at their old sites. Before the capitulation, these out-stations also retired to the Canazei area.

- 10th Company, LNR 3

This company represented the link between W-Leit 2 and Signals Regiment West, to which latter it was assigned administratively as well as operationally. It had its own HF DF stations located in Biarritz, Bordeaux, Montpellier and Genoa, and a VHF DF system comprising stations in Toulon, Mont Agel and Portofino. Its tactical evaluation section worked closely with the combat units based in the south of France, which operated against convoys along the coast of French North Africa. Most of their coverage was directed against Mediterranean Allied Coastal Air Force (MACAF) in the western Mediterranean, while the Malta based reconnaissance was monitored by W-Leit 2. The 10th Company LNR 3 was responsible for sinking the Italian battleship Roma. In addition, the company had attached to it a small intercept platoon, which covered takeoff and landing traffic of the Northern African, southern Italian and Sardinian airfields on 6440kilocycles.

The monitoring receivers of the 10th Co. LNR 3 were controlled by Referat C and were assigned as follows:

Grouped assignment of receivers
Type of traffic intercepted	No. of Receivers
MACAF (air-to-ground and point-to-point)	25
Free French traffic in Africa	3
HF RT on 6440Kilocycles	5

Added to these were four to six VHF receivers of the intercept platoon Golf-club on Mont Agel. This intercept platoon enjoyed the same sort of favourable site for observing Corsica as the Noto station in Sicily had the previous year with respect to Malta. If its results were not so brilliant, that was due to the less experienced personnel, but also because the Mediterranean Allied Tactical Air Force units based in northern Corsica flew more often into Northern Italy than Southern France; therefore after their assembly they generally had to be turned over to the intercept platoon at Portofino. The Golf-club worked well if German fighters were available when medium bombers of the 12th Air Force attacked communication lines in Southern France. Following the invasion of Southern France by the Allied forces, the unit worked its way back to Germany via Italy without losing men or receivers sets. Its parent company moved from Montpellier to Avignon as early as May 1944, and then moved again to Freiburg im Breisgau, where it joined the Luftwaffe Western Signals Regiment.

- W-Leit Southeast

Luftwaffe organisation of High-Frequency DF baselines in the central Mediterranean area from May 1943 to September 1944. As the German Army conquered Italy, Sicily and Tunisia, Luftwaffe Signal Intelligence established DF baselines, radar intercept and radar jamming sites and signal intercept out-stations among the different locations in the central Mediterranean to detect Allied heavy-bomber movements. As the Allies pushed the Axis first out of Tunisia, and then Sicily, up the spine of Italy, the Luftwaffe progressively established new DF baselines as it withdrew. By late 1944, the Luftwaffe were pushed back into Germany.

Luftwaffe Italian organisation of Very High Frequency DF stations in the first half of 1944.

Luftwaffe Balkan organisation of Very High-Frequency DF stations in the first half of 1944.

The diagram represents the largest geographic expansion of the Luftwaffe W-Leit Southeast unit. The coloured areas indicate the areas of control for specific signals units.

Just as the advance of the bases of fighter-bombers was of decisive importance in the operation of Luftwaffe signals in Italy, so did the transfer of heavy bombers from Tunis and Benghazi to the Foggia area affect W-Leit Southeast. The out-stations on Crete, Rhodes and Pyrgos for radar and radio traffic (RT) intercept proved no value when the 15th Expeditionary Mobility Task Force (15th USAAF) flew against targets in the Ploiești oil areas, and the capital city of the Balkans.

In order to protect the west flank of this area, out-stations were established as fast as possible along the Adriatic coast. As the Balkan Mountains rose sharply to the eastward, two cordons of VHF RT and radar intercept stations were established. The first along the coast in Valona, Durrës, Dubrovnik, Split, Zadar with the second, farther back that included stations in Skopje, Niš, Pančevo, Zagreb, Thessaloniki and at the mountain Vitosha. A basic condition pertaining to this cordon was that the stations should not be more than 300km apart so that each could hear any transmitter within 150km of its own site, the maximum effective range for VHF reception. Personnel were drawn from Aegean positions to operate these stations. Besides the monitoring of ground radar, the radar intercept stations had the prime mission of DF-ing Allied Identification friend or foe (IFF) during the raid. DF-ing of Air-to-surface-vessel (ASV) and shipborne radar against surprise attacks by seaplanes and opponents naval units. As the intercept stations on the Adriatic Sea were in some cases directly opposite the airfields in Italy, used by heavy-bombers, and therefore promised excellent results, the Chi-Stelle, rather exceptionally, granted a large number of sets to the Southeast for this purpose.

The basis of flight path tracking in the Balkans was always the evaluated intercepts from the Allies radar networks. In order to be certain of hearing them after the transfer of the heavy bomber groups from North Africa to the Foggia area, a large intercept platoon later expanded to a company, was moved from Tirana to Albania. Its mission was the tactical evaluation of bomber formation positions broadcast by the radar stations and the forwarding of this information to the Albanian Air Command. These reports were also sent to the battalion, that in turn transmitted them to the operational Command Posts in the Balkans, which might be concerned. The units and Command Posts interested in these reports were authorized to listen in on the broadcasts of the Signals Battalion Southeast.

The evaluation of weather reports which appeared in tactical traffic had to be turned over to the chief weather station at Luftwaffe HQ, owing to the increasing work of the battalion. This function had provided all units with Allied weather data and in consequence, the German High Command spared itself from sending weather reconnaissance aircraft in this theatre. After the central African supply route lost its significance, the coverage of this traffic was turned back to W-13 in Oberhaching.

When Fliegerkorps X moved from Greece to France in autumn 1943, German air power suffered a serious reduction in the Balkans, the signals company in Crete was withdrawn to Loutsa. In view of the worsening situation in the Mediterranean, Luftflotte Southeast moved from Athens to Thessaloniki. The battalion followed with the evaluation company, two intercept companies, and a radar intercept company. The signals battalion moved from Thessaloniki to Pančevo which comprised 26 rhombics that had an angle of refraction from Turkey to northern Italy and was the largest rhombic aerial installation in Europe. In January 1944, the battalion moved to Pančevo with the Luftflotte. The battalion was further expanded after its arrival in Pančevo. The flights of heavy bombers made it necessary to erect a new radar intercept station in Alexandroupoli, Brăila, Debrecen and Budapest. With the reoccupation of the fixed intercept station in Premstätten, the battalion located itself for the first time on German soil. At this time the signals company in Constanța was assigned to it, operating against Russia with out-stations in the Crimeea. Thus the outposts of the battalion were spread over an area which extended from Crimea to Crete, and from Munich to Styria. There were several companies in all, which formed a larger organisation that the signal regiment of Luftflotte Southeast, to which it was assigned administratively.

In order to assist German reconnaissance aircraft, the battalion set up fighter warning stations on Rhodes, Crete and later Durazzo in the spring of 1943. These stations received and possessed the reports and observations of the VHF and radar intercept stations and the information was broadcast to the aircraft on the tactical reconnaissance frequency. Six months later, after moving from Athens, W-Leit Southeast established a central Meldeköpfe for the whole Southeast. Later when the unit was moved to Pančevo, the Meldeköpfe was expanded further. Good land lines enabled the battalion for the first time to communicate with most of its companies and out-stations by direct wire. The increased communication performance improved flight path tracking.

In addition, the entire HF coverage for heavy bombers was concentrated in one intercept company in Pančevo. A DF centre with HF and VHF DFs and a radar intercept receiver was established in Pančevo. The concentration of the means of communication and direct cooperation between out-stations and the Meldeköpfe, perfected the flight path tracking service. Difficulties were encountered in following the night intruder missions of No. 205 Group RAF owing to its radio discipline and its habit of flying in very small formations. But when a Korfu 812 receiver picked up a formation of 205 Group at a great distance, prior to an attack on Budapest, and thereafter most radar intercept stations were fitted out with these sets, the detection of 205 Group posed no further difficulties. DF-ing the IFF made it possible to differentiate between bombers and aircraft on supply-drop missions. At the beginning of 1944, the Allies appeared to be aware of the disadvantages of leaving the IFF turned on, as most formations turned them off as they crossed the coast.

The most modern method of flight path tracking was DF-ing the Allied panoramic devices. Thanks to the installation of H2X in P-38 weather aircraft, it was possible to notify German headquarters of the 15th Air Force's target for the following day, during the last period of the war. The reconnaissance pilot, when over the target area, increased the pulse recurrence frequency of the Mickey probably to photograph the scope picture, and this higher PRF could be distinguished in the head-set of the German Naxburg receiver. As DF of H2X enabled the position of the reconnaissance aircraft to be ascertained at all times, it could be easily determined where the photographs were taken.

The facilities of the Meldeköpfe, which were always being improved and made to conform more and more to the requirements of a war of movement, and its performance, contributed notably towards the high regard in which the battalion was held by the German commanders in the southeast. After the battalion's retreat due to the breakthrough of the Russians, it was reestablished at Premstätten. Shortly thereafter it was consolidated with the then unsatisfactory Meldeköpfe Vienna to form a central Meldeköpfe for the southeast. In January–February 1945, as the Russian advance started to threaten Vienna, the unit was installed in buses and in this was remained operational until the last days of the Reich.

At the time of its apex and the greatest geographical expanse in the first half of 1944, Signals Battalion Southeast comprised the following units:

- 1 evaluation company with Meldeköpfe and radar intercept centre in Pančevo.
- 1 HF intercept company with 30 receivers in Pančevo that included tracking for air-to-ground traffic of the 15th Air Force, radar and air raid warning networks, Balkan Air Force, and command and liaison networks.
- 1 HF intercept company with 30 receivers in Pančevo for point-to-point networks of 15th Air Force, RAF 205 group, RAF Middle East Command(AHQ Middle East) and transport.
- 1 intercept company in Athens with out-stations on Crete, Rhodes and the Aegean Islands for air-to-ground traffic in the eastern Mediterranean, about 18 receivers in additions, RT teams with HF and VHF receivers and radar intercept stations.
- 1 intercept company in Tirana with outstations in Valona, Durazzo, Dubrovnik, Split and Zara for use by HF and VHF teams and radar intercept stations.
- 1 intercept company in Constanța with outstations in the Crimea and in Stara Zagora and the radar intercept stations on the Turkish border. The Black Sea had seven receivers and 10 receivers were used to intercept Turkish traffic.
- 1 Radar intercept company with out-stations in Bulgaria, Romania and Hungary.

When Bulgaria and Romania joined the Allies in mid-1944, those out-stations in the Balkans had to be withdrawn in haste. The radar intercept stations were in part moved to Hungary or used to reinforce other stations. When the Romanian and Soviet forces had advanced on Timișoara, the companies in Pančevo withdrew according to orders, to the previously prepared station in Premstätten. Only the excellent DF centre personnel in Pančevo remained at their post until the Russian advance was just west of Pančevo and threatened the route of escape. Concomitantly the intercept company in Tirana had withdrawn its out-stations and by dint of uninterrupted engagements with partisans, fought its way up to the Marburg area, having joined forces with a combat group there. It established operations in the Marburg area. The battalion had done an exemplary job in providing for the evacuation of its detachments on the islands of the Aegean Sea, although some units were left behind. The signals company in Athens retreated in time. A signals platoon in Constanța was captured by Romanian units and the remainder of the company joined the Signals Regiment East.

After all these withdrawals, the battalion assembled in the staging area in Graz, while at the same time the W-Leit 2 withdrew from Italy to the Alps. Both battalions had to be rebuilt from the ground up. The problem of the reorganisation of signals intelligence in the south again became acute. As there was already a Signals Regiment in the east and the west, the two battalions in the south, that were drawing closer all the time, were united into one Signals Regiment. From the point of view of the key personnel, this unification was a compromise solution as both battalions had performed equally well in the last year. W-Leit 2 furnished the backbone of the regimental evaluation company and W-Leit Southeast provided the regimental commander.

- Referat C

The prestige gained by this Referat during the previous year increased considerably when the evaluation company of W-Leit 2 ceased operations for the time as a result of the Allied landing in Italy on 3 September 1943 and Pietro Badoglio capitulation on 8 September 1943 and the Referat had to take over the evaluation of the material intercepted in Italy. However, the Referat was not able to retain this position of leadership. After the reorganisation of W-Leit 2, instead of occupying itself exclusively with the final analysis and placing all superfluous personnel at the disposal of the battalions, it retained an extensive and bureaucratic office machinery, even though its work was decreasing in importance since tactical evaluation had become the most vital service rendered by the Luftwaffe Referat. Nevertheless, the Referat rendered a valuable contribution in following the growth and disposition of the Allied Mediterranean Air Force. After the formation of the Signals Regiment South, the intention was to merge the Referat and the regimental evaluation company had been done in the case of Signal Regiment West after its withdrawal from France. The Russian winder offensive in January 1945 and the acute transportation situation in Germany delayed the timely execution of this plan. When the Marstall had to be evacuated in February 1945, as a result of the threatened position of Berlin, a number of the evaluations were turned over to the Army for use in the defence of the capital, and the remainder was sent to the regimental evaluation company. The final monthly report sent out by the regiment were give distribution according to both the regimental and Chi-Stelle distribution lists.

===== Evaluation =====
The length of the war made it possible for evaluation sections to accumulate a great wealth of experience and highly qualified specialists. The exchange of intelligence data between the west and south were both accomplished through the Chi-stelle and by exchanging officers and evaluation specialists on temporary duty status. Seen as a whole, the development of the evaluation sections ran parallel. The emphasis in evaluation shifted more and more from the strategic to the tactical. This accounts for the increasing importance of the two battalions over Referat C in the final year of the war.

Both signals battalions had created a highly sensitive apparatus in well-integrated companies, out-stations, signals liaison officer and central evaluation companies. W-Leit 2 and Meldeköpfe Southeast had direct wire communication with the ZAF. Later Meldeköpfe Vienna became the information centre on flights of bombers from the south. Here, as in the west, a clear distinction was made between the tactical evaluation which the Meldeköpfe was engaged in and final analysis which was reserved to the evaluation company. Up until the last moment, signals intelligence kept pace with the development of Allied radar.

===== Signal communication =====
The decisive importance of tactical evaluation called for a developed and serviceable communication network. Whereas strategic intelligence could be forwarded to headquarters by courier, the tactical report was dispatched immediately and by electric transmission, either telephone or teleprinter to permit prompt countermeasures. In Italy, good communication was achieved by grouping intercept and DF stations and by establishing advanced signals control points. In the Balkans, signals possessed its first good land-lines in Pančevo thanks to Luftflotte Southeast. The Meldeköpfe in Pančevo had direct lines to all larger tactical air headquarters. Radio was an additional facility.

The VHF and radar intercept reports at first sent through separate channels were later dispatched over the same network. These networks were so organised that even in the event of an accumulation of messages, no one station would be overburdened.

After the Allies forced the withdrawn to Premstätten, the landline problem became acute for the signals battalion southeast, as the only lines of underground cable between Graz and Vienna were constantly being severed due to bombing attacks. For this reason, Attersee where there was an important junction of telephone lines, was along the line of withdrawal, was chosen as the next signals headquarters.

===== Liaison =====
From the time when bombing attacks on the Balkans and Southern Germany were intensified, signals liaison officers were assigned not only to operational headquarters but to combat units as well. All had wire and radio communications with both signals battalions in the south. Two or three times each day they were apprised of the air situation by telephone and imported this information at the planning and briefing conferences. As flight path tracking was perfected, the signals liaison officers gradually developed from assistants of Ic-Dienst (intelligence) to Ia-Dienst (operations). Since the Air Raid Warning Service often failed to keep abreast of the grand-scale operations of the 15th Air Force, signals provided the only means of obtaining a reliable air situation report. Moreover, in contrast to the Air Raid Warning Service, signals could report strength and type of aircraft. In the war room of the fighter commands and the Jagddivision, a map of the situation as reported by signals was maintained, as well as one of the reports of the Air Raid Warning Service. This won many friends for signals at the Operational Command Posts. Units and Command Posts received signals predictions of raids and probable targets, sometimes hours before the raids began. Later on during the approach flights, signals furnished estimates on the strength, aircraft types and altitude of the Allied formation.

While during the first years of the war the relation between signals and Ic-Dienst grew close, it was relatively late before Ia-Dienst (operations) was awakened. Not until the decline of the Luftwaffe did operations grasp at signals information and pose questions and problems. It was especially interested in the tactics of Allied combat units, i.e. fighters, medium and heavy bombers and the modus operandi of Allied radar, jamming, equipment and other sundries. In order to make effective use of limited forces, operations conferred with the signals when special missions were planned. Likewise, the Fighter Warning Service was of concern to operations and the Chief of Staff. Questions of equipment, strength and deployment of the Allied air forces were of special interest to intelligence, while new intelligence of the opponents tactics received greater attention from operations.

===== Miscellaneous =====
The Allied invasion of Sicily was thoroughly planned by the Allies. First attacks by heavy bombers reduced most of the Sicilian cities to rubble and spread an indescribable panic through the already war-weary population. Acting simultaneously, Allied naval and assault forces captured the outlying islands around Sicily. The Italian garrisons of these islands surrendered almost without resistance with the sole exception of Lampedusa. Shortly before the landing, the Allied fighters on Malta were increased fourfold and the tactical air force that included the No. 205 Group RAF moved forward to the airfields of northern Tunisia that Germany had just evacuated. At the same time a concentration of radars was observed, which presumably was intended to accompany the Allied landings. By conscientious coverage, Signals was, in these weeks between the fall of Tunis (Tunisian Campaign) and the appearance of Allied landing fleet, able to categorise all the radio traffic characteristics.

Radio procedure characterising landings in the Mediterranean In the Mediterranean, the Allies worked out a plan for the preparation and execution of landing operations, the principal features of which recurred in each landing, albeit with new refinements and variations. This was especially reflected in the transmissions of radio traffic. Hints from other intelligence sources alerted the German signals to the necessity of, especially close, monitoring.

These hints coming mostly from the Abwehr:

- Reports of special ground force and airborne units being brought to a state of readiness.
- Reports of concentrations and preparations of landing craft, troop transports and warships in Allied harbours.

These espionage reports were sometimes confirmed by photo reconnaissance and prisoner of war interrogations.

In the meantime, the General der Nachrichtenaufklärung learned of the withdrawal of certain large Allied units from the Front and ascertained that they were being trained for landing operations. This was true of the whole divisions. The air support parties of such units then retired to the rear, where they were heard in practice traffic, their former combat sectors having been taken over by adjacent units and to a limited degree, replacement units.

From the air-to-ground traffic the following could be determined:

- Fighter units were withdrawn from their regular sector, and move to new bases.
- Movement of staffs and formation of advanced echelons noted from the appearance of advanced and rear echelon call signs.
- Units formerly based to the read would take over bases nearer the front, vacated by units which had moved still farther forward. There would be an increase in the missions flown.
- Preparatory bombing missions by heavy bombers against transportation centres and installations to the rear of the proposed landing area, that began three weeks before the landing.
- Increased operations of medium bombers over the landing area, beginning about one week before the landing.
- Increased reconnaissance activity over the proposed beachhead immediately prior to the Allied landing.
- Increased fighter bomber attacks in the landing area up until the moment of landing.

The Allied radar networks revealed the following:

- Withdrawal of radar installations from the Front and reorganisation of Signal Aircraft Warning Service.
- New accumulation or radar apparatus in the staging area.
- Concentration of operational radar at designated invasion bases and sweeping in the direction of intended attack. For example the massing of radars in Northwest Corsica before the landing in southern France.
- Readying of certain navigational aids used only in landing operations.

The German radar intercept service could DF the movements of the Allies and identify the different radar transmissions intercepted as Ground Controlled Interception or gun-laying radar (Fire-control radar) or in the case of naval radar, to distinguish between different types of vessels. The start and course of the landing fleet and its concentration opposite the beachheads could be followed.

Just before the landing, fighter control stations aboard shop would maintain contact with the fighter cover and with aircraft patrolling the beachhead. Later, these control stations were removed to hastily constructed fighter aerodromes. At the same time, Army and Air Force Command Posts would be created on the strips and the advanced echelons on the beachhead would be recognised in the WT and support staff.

After landing facilities has been established on the beachhead, advances headquarters began to appear in the radio traffic. After the first aviation units had been set up on the newly constructed aerodromes, their fighter controls were also transferred from the ships and took over the RT traffic on the aerodromes.

Luftwaffe Signal Intelligence was in a position to give the following advance information, after gleaning the necessary experience from the first landings:

- It could be predicted approximately a month in advance that there would be a landing.
- In a somewhat lesser time, the general area of the landing could be predicated.
- The strength of the units to be employed in the landing could be estimated.
- Naval units available could be determined.
- One week before the landing the exact spot for the proposed beachhead could be stated.

- The bombing of Frascati on 8 December 1943

The information from reliable sources that the signals battalion in Italy gathered was possible to take certain security and protective measures against the anticipated treachery of Pietro Badoglio who would later become Prime minister of Italy on 25 July 1943. Signals reports were still supplied to the Italian Supreme Command up to a few days before the capitulation of Italy. The Supreme Command especially in Frascati, an ever-growing interest in the signals battalion and this eas expressed by numerous visits to its installations by Staff officers of the Italian Army, Navy and Airforce. Even though it was strict Luftwaffe and German policy to not permit dubious visits to the unit any more than necessary, it was nevertheless unavoidable that the Italians realised the critical importance of signal intelligence. On 8 September, more than 160 B-24's attacked Frascati. The evaluation company and barracks of the unit were attacked with precision and reduced to rubble. The Luftwaffe believed the Italians had provided information to the allies that made it a special target. A direct hit on the dugout of the former signals company Africa killed 36 people. Whilst military damage was insignificant, the whole city and half the civilian population fell victims to the bombardment. The Command Post South was in operation in auxiliary headquarters within eight hours and was able to direct the encirclement of the Italian divisions concentrated in the Rome area.

The requisitioning and commandeering that followed the bombing made it possible for the signal companies to increase their complement of receivers, fuel and most valuable, vehicles to such an extent that the signal units were finally able to achieve a state of mobile motorised units. This deserves special mention as the crippling lack of vehicles, up to that time, made it impossible for the unit to keep in constant touch with their out-stations.

- The bombing of the Italian battleship Roma

After the Italian capitulation, the Italian battleship Roma steamed out of Livorno and sailed down the Tyrrhenian Sea, a British reconnaissance aircraft sighted it and reported its position to its ground station immediately. The encoded message was intercepted and read by the 10th Company LNR 3 and its importance realised immediately. The South France Air Command was informed. Fortunately, the South France airfields had some Heinkel He 111 in operational readiness. The British reconnaissance aircraft continued transmitting reports, enabling the Luftwaffe to be kept up to date on the position of the escaping fleet, but also learned the success of its own attack on the Roma. This was considered by the 10th Company LNR 3 to be the most successful day the company ever had.

- 9th Company, LNR 3 in Soriano. Last quarter of 1943

While the evaluation company of the signals battalion in Italy withdrew to the Padua area after the bombing in Frascati, the work in its companies and out-stations continued. Since RT call-signs were then beginning to appear in air support traffic, close liaison developed between the evaluation units working on these types of traffic, that especially improved tactical evaluation and in turn, the service rendered to combat units by the out-stations. The evaluation of air support traffic coupled with messages given in advance of notice of missions, spared German fighters the necessity of making patrol flights and enabled them to take-off again attacking fighters and fighter-bombers even before the warning was to be obtained from RT traffic. The Luftwaffe at this time was already so inferior to the Allies in numbers in a manner that it could afford sorties when there was a definite promise of success. This was possible only with the help of Luftwaffe Signal Intelligence.

In order to render this aid as reliable and comprehensive as possible, the 9th Company, LNR 32 with evaluators and intercept personnel was placed at the disposal of the 2nd Air Corps Command in Viterbo as an independent signals unit. This command was the forward echelon of Fliegerkorps II that had moved to Bergamo. The battalion reinforced the company with air support and radar specialists as well as experienced intercept operators and the VHF stations in the forward area that were subordinated to it. Exchange of reports and operational advice to Luftwaffe and Heer units was accomplished through the signals liaison officer at the 2nd Air Command Headquarters. Finally, even the fighter Warning Service previously located in Perugia with the (F)122, the Luftwaffe long-range reconnaissance unit (German: Fernaufklärungsgruppe) was transferred to Soriano, so that the 9th Company would also have available the results of RT operations by the two out-stations at Monte Cavo and Atri. The RT out-stations on Monte Cavo manned with what was considered excellent personnel formerly in the Noto station, covered all RT traffic in the Cassino sector, where the mass of German fighters was employed. Moreover, it was so favourably situated in relation to the Anzio beachhead that some evaluation problems were cleared by visual observation.

Besides an evaluation section, the company had five receivers on air support traffic, 20 receivers for monitoring Allied Radar reporting networks and at least 5 VHF receivers together with a VHF DF network. This collection of intercept and evaluation forces at the Command Post of an Air Command made for a briefing by the signals liaison office, who soon became the close advisor to operations. The liaison office passed information directly to the ground force units, while the Army signals liaison officer on hand informed only his parent signals organisation.

- The Battle for the Aegean Islands, autumn 1943

After Italy's withdrawal from the war, any degree of security for the German position in the Balkans depended on the control of numerous islands around Greece, that in some cases, the Italian garrisons had immediately surrendered to the British. The German counter-attacks were well planned and executed with very limited but carefully selected forces. Luftwaffe signals was asked to support these intended operations. Therefore, a number of tactical evaluators were transferred from Athens to out-stations and communication arranged between these out-stations and Fliegerkorps X. Before the attack began, British radar reporting networks were monitored, and the deciphered messages passed on to the Fliegerkorps. As the Allied radar stations on Castelrosso, Symi, Nisyros and other islands, reported plots on both German and Allied aircraft, Luftwaffe signals could not only give warning of Allied air attack, but could provide a check on the conduct of Luftwaffe air operations. Some assistance was also obtained from air raid warnings broadcast on Turkish police networks.

The signal documents were among the most comprehensive that ever fell into German hands. They confirmed the thorough and reliable work of German signals to a marked degree.

- Preparations for an Adriatic Landing, October 1944

During the second half of 1944, the Luftwaffe Signal Intelligence Service in Italy covered a variety of traffic, which bore all the signs of preparation for an Allied landing operation, but which differed from previous enterprises of like nature in several ways.

As early as July of this year, it was noticed that the American 5th Army was shifting of its weight of its forces to its right flank. Here it was joined to the British 8th Army, which was pressing its attack in the direction of Lake Comacchio. These adjustments served to shorten the front of the 8th Army. A further development was the transfer of the Canadian XIII Corps from the 8th to the 5th Army in September.

This fact, established by the General der Nachrichtenaufklärung, aroused the suspicion that the British 8th Army was to be withdrawn from the front, in preparation for another operation of great magnitude.

British divisions were continually being withdrawn from the Front and assembled in the Fano-Rimini area. The radio stations sent practice traffic from these positions as the General der Nachrichtenaufklärung found out by its observations.

For a short period, the Desert Air Force had been performing tactical reconnaissance for the 5th Army, since two of the latter's reconnaissance squadrons, i.e. the 225th Reconnaissance Squadron and the 111th Reconnaissance Squadron, both of the 12th Air Force, had been temporarily withdrawn. After the situation had been righted, the tactical reconnaissance area of the DAF was retracted eastward to include only the right flank of the Canadian XIII Corps.

The concentration of the tactical reconnaissance activity was around Venice. This gave rise to the expectation of a leapfrog landing in the Venice area. However, further developments belied this assumption. The increasing reduction of the British Eighth Army pointed towards a major undertaking of some sort. Photo reconnaissance of the Ancona area revealed the gathering of a landing fleet. The strength of the fleet was not proportionate to the requirements of a leapfrog landing.

While Desert Air Force (DAF) tactical reconnaissance had up to this point concentrated mainly on the area south of the Padua-Venice line, it was now extended to Udine-Istria area. Moreover, No. 239 Wing RAF (DAF) sent fighter-bombers over Pola, and the 15th Air Force and No. 205 Group RAF launched their heavy bomber attacks in such a manner as to indicate intentions of a landing in this area. At the same time, the Allied radar service had undergone a reorganisation, particularly on the eastern sector of the front, in the course of which more than twenty installations were concentrated in the Ancona area. The following was learned from the radio traffic:

As was usual after a day of battle, a relaxing of radio discipline was quite noticeable. Airfield radio messages exchanged greetings and salutations and sang the praise of the local wine and women. All the airfield radio stations of the DAF indicated a movement when closing down. On the following day no traffic was heard on any frequency. During the morning of the next day, air support traffic was intercepted in volume corresponding to that on previous days. It was identical with previous traffic in respect to type of transmission and to form and context of messages and message preambles. Through the efforts of the RT operators, it was learned that these were not the same previous air support networks, but rather completely new ones. New transmitters and communication personnel had appeared at all the airfield radio stations. Differences in type of transmission and code speed allowed this conclusion to be drawn.

Creating this reserve of radio operators and sets gave the DAF units great freedom of action. It meant that they could continue with their current operations up until D-day, and then when the signal was given, jump right into their new commitment since experienced communication personnel would be waiting to serve them. Monitoring of Allied point-to-point networks and the interception of Allied radar also furnished illuminating intelligence.

Preparations for this landing differed in several essential points from those undertaking a previous landing included:

- The flexibility in operational tactics developed by both the Army and the Air Forces allowed their units to maintain current operations, while at the same time preparing themselves for the new undertaking.
- Changes in the Allied intentions and a certain anxiety on their part could be deduced from the shifting of the weight of the Allies reconnaissance.
- The length time given to preparation bore no relation to the importance of the operation being planned.
- In connection with the points above, the lengthy and drawn-out nature of the preparations was especially striking; at times it seemed as though the operation preparations had stopped entirely.

All these factors led to the conclusion that the question as to whether a landing would take place depended more on political than military considerations. The undertaking never was realised in any form. Towards the end of the year, the radar equipment which had been concentrated in the Ancona area was redeployed on the eastern and middle sectors of the front. Likewise, units of the Eighth Army that had been withdrawn were returned to the line. The Canadian XIII Corps was again placed under command of British Eighth Army and the area of tactical reconnaissance of the DAF was broadened to include the left flank of the Canadian Corps. The American Fifth Army transferred its spearheads back to the middle sector and pressed its attack in the same direction as previously. Through the redistribution of units, Eighth Army again become operational.

==== The German Collapse October 1944 to May 1945 ====
===== General =====
The belated activation of the regiment did not increase the efficiency of signal intelligence in the south owing to the collapse of the fronts outside the borders of Germany and to the breakdown of communication within Germany itself. Despite the continued success of the Allies and the continuous withdrawals of Luftwaffe forces, the signals organisation that had reliable signals leadership in the south was able to make new successes. At the beginning of 1945, the Russians made their first penetration into Styria with Graz appearing to be threatened, the regimental staff, the evaluation company and one intercept company moved to Attersee. Following the Vienna Offensive, they were joined by Meldeköpfe 4 and the intercept companies previously located in the Vienna area. Likewise, out-stations in the south, west and east to be withdrawn because of Allied advances. The 2nd Battalion with two intercept companies moved to Stainach-Pürgg area.

In order to avoid capture when American units advanced into Salzkammergut, the regimental staff along with two attached companies moved to the area of the 2nd Battalion in steinach. After the German Instrument of Surrender documents had been signed, all the units attached to Luftflotte 6 moved to an internment camp in the Aschbach area where other elements of the 2nd Battalion were also gradually assembled. Women auxiliaries who had still not been discharged were either billeted in private homes or delivered to the women's discharge camp.

The 1st Battalion fell into the hands of the British forces in Canazei. Its women auxiliaries were interned in a camp near Bologna and the male personnel were taken to Naples under a misconception on the part of some RAF officers who had thought they had unearthed a spy ring.

===== Organisation =====
The creation of the regiment resulted in the combining of the two evaluation companies of the battalions into a single regimental evaluation company that was placed directly under the command of regimental headquarters, as was the Vienna Meldeköpfe. Each battalion comprised three radio intercept companies and one radar intercept company. Their duties were divided according to speciality, i.e. HF, VHF or radar, and geographical circumstances. A large evaluation platoon was attached to the 1st Battalion for the purposes of tactical evaluation. However, it remained assigned to regimental headquarters. In this way, all evaluation and liaison work was centrally directed (Fig 14)

Receivers for the various intercept tasks were allocated as follows:

Grouped assignment of receivers
Unit	No. of Receivers
Allied air support units (point-to-point)	65
Allied radar networks	30
9th Company, LNR 32	100
Command and liaison networks; Easter Mediterranean and Balkan traffic, Transport and supply traffic	50
Mediterranean Allied Strategic Air Force (15th USAAF and RAF 205 Group)	25
Total	170

To this were added approximately 35 VHF receivers, bringing the total number of receivers operated by Ln. Regiment 352 to 205. The DF network comprised 23 High Frequency DF units and various radar intercept receivers, spread over 15 out-stations totalling approximately 100 units.

As the regiment was designed for mobile warfare, it remained operational, right to the very end, although restricted to an ever-narrowing area of land. When liaison with headquarters was no longer possible due to the collapse of the Command, the regiment commander with the help of the staffs of the VHF out-stations began to prepare a fighter warning service for the civilian population. When Franz Hofer, the Gauleiter of Linz requested the regiment to assign a signals liaison officer to his office. The surrender in the south brought an end to signals intelligence development in the south brought an end to development along the line.

===== Strength =====
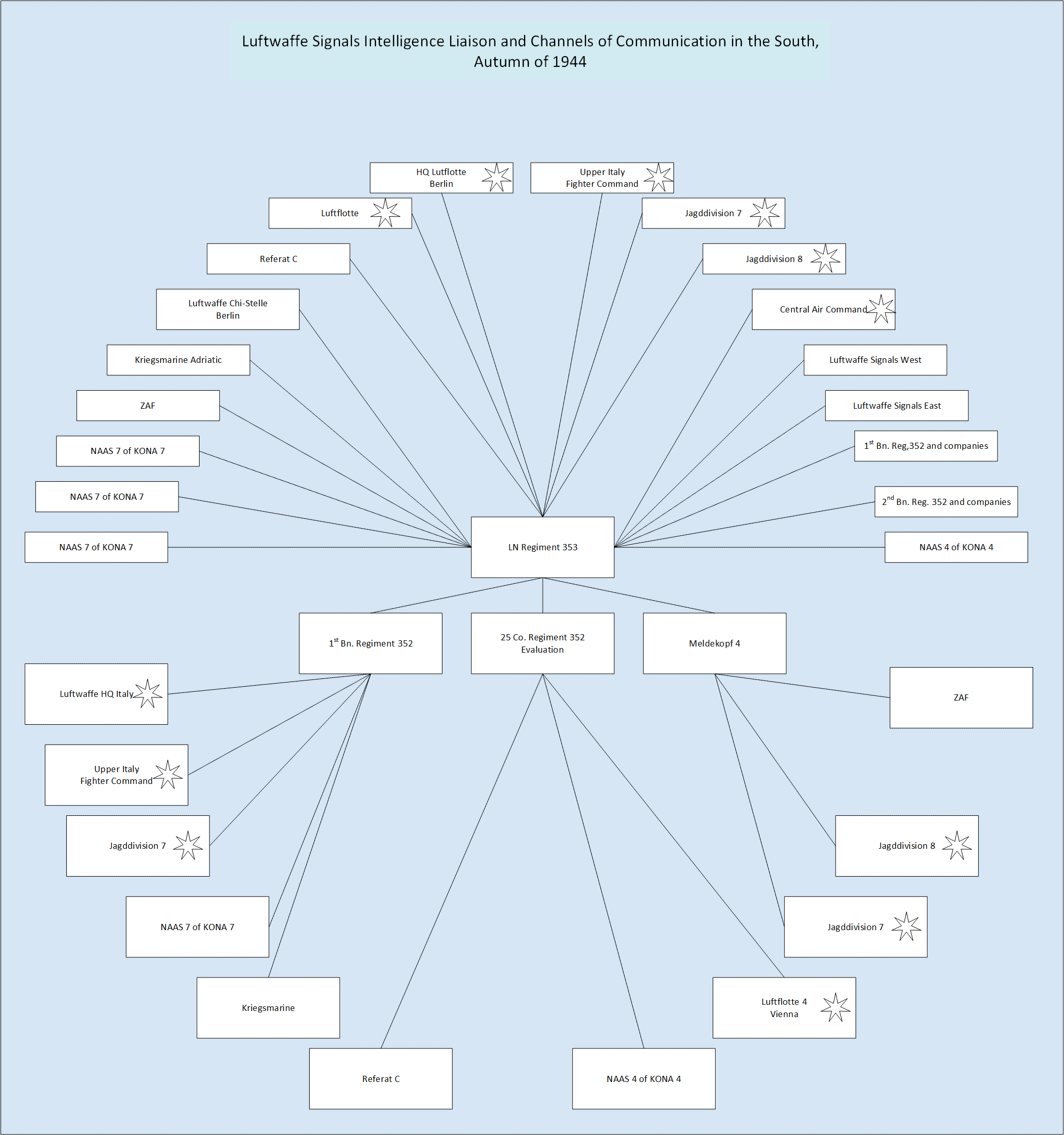
Liaison and channel of communications of the Luftwaffe signals in the south, autumn of 1944. The diagram represents the flow of flash reports containing radio intelligence that are forwarded from the central organisation to the satellite unit who receive them. The star indicates that the unit has a liaison officer.

Unit Strength
Unit	No. of Men
Regimental staff	30
Battalion staffs	40
25th Company, LNR 352	200
26th Company, LNR 352	350
6 radio intercept companies	1200
2 radar intercept companies	700
Total Personnel	2600

The regiment had a total of only 350 women auxiliaries. After activation of the regiment, approximately 300 soldiers were transferred to signals units in the west and to other combat elements.

===== Signal communication =====
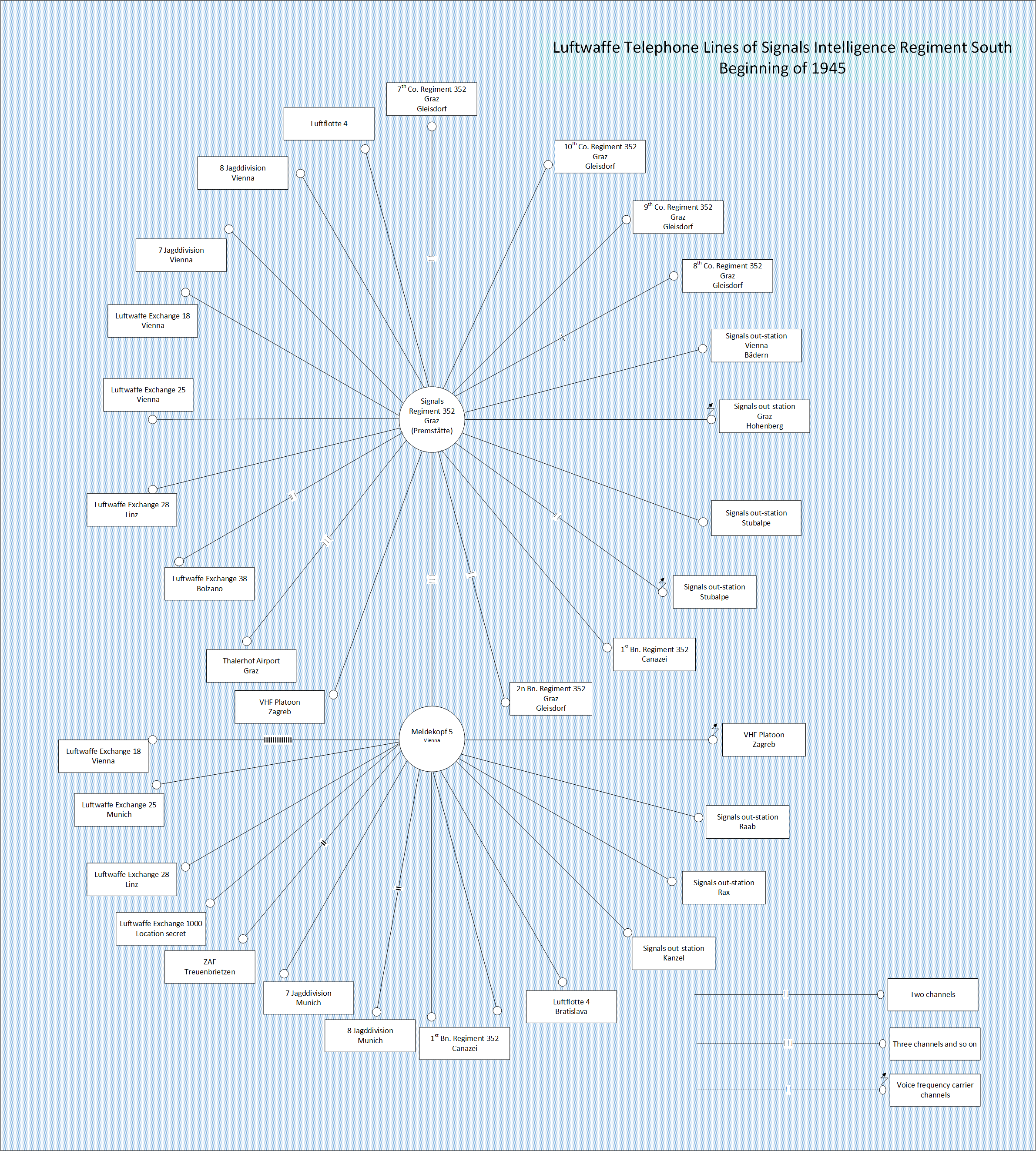
Luftwaffe telephone system for the Signals Regiment South (Ln 352) at the beginning of 1945

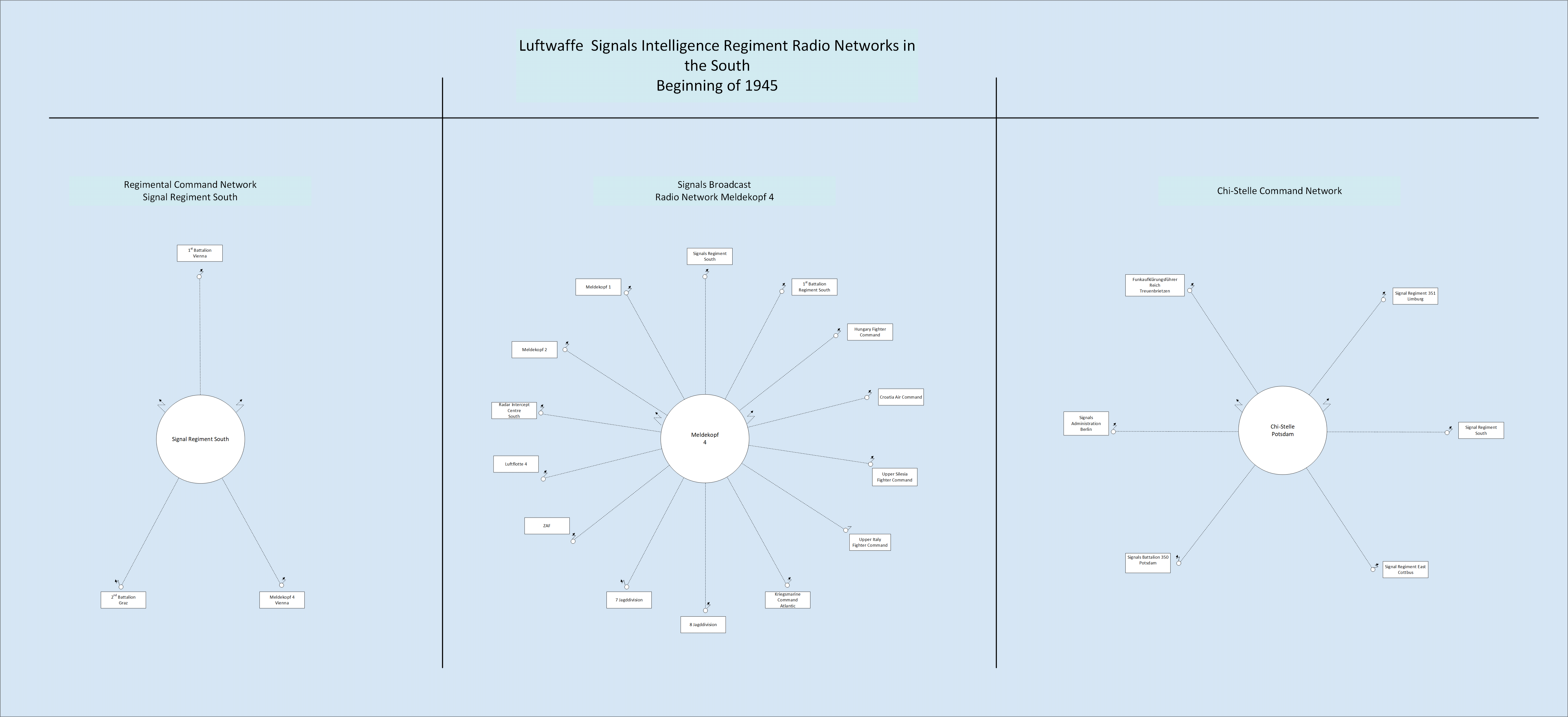
Luftwaffe Signal Intelligence radio networks in the south, at the beginning of 1945

The diagram represents the communication system for Luftwaffe Signals Regiment South. The regiment was controlled by Meldeköpfe Vienna, the central communication control station for the whole regiment. Each radar or intercept out-station would communicate with the Meldeköpfe either via direct telephone line by teleprinter when it was available, or by radio link when direct telephone lines were not available, usually later in the war.

- Telephone

There were direct lines from the regiment to all headquarters and to the large signals units. Direct lines also connected to Luftwaffe exchanges located in the vicinity of the regiment (Fig 16)
In the case of operational calls, the Luftwaffe exchange would hold lines open for signals, when the codeword Dante was used. The tactical evaluation section and commanding officers were authorised to use operational priority (German: Führungblitz) for urgent calls. In general, this prerogative was limited to section chiefs of the General Staff. Security in conversations was maintained by the use of a telephone code. Signal Intelligence telephone exchanges also had cover names, e.g. Pirate, Clairvoyant, Heather.

- Teleprinter

Signals had its own teletype system which could be used by no other Luftwaffe unit. Combination teletype and cypher machines i.e. Siemens and Halske T52 were generally only to be found at higher headquarters but in the case of signals, they were distributed down to companies and platoons. Top secret messages had to be sent by teletype-cypher machine only.

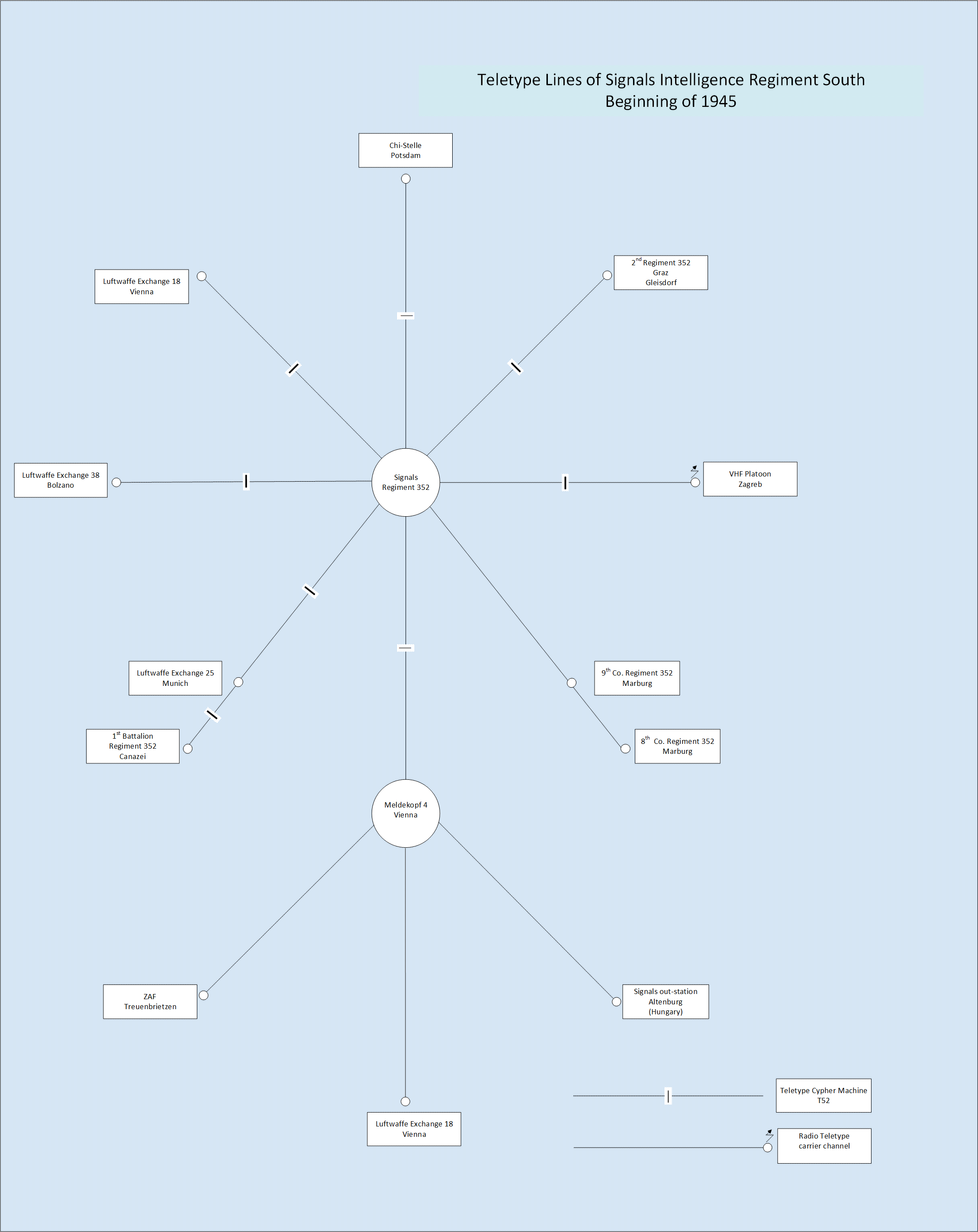
Luftwaffe teletype network for the Signals Regiment South (Ln 352) at the beginning of 1945

- Radio

In the southeast radio remained the most important means of signal communication; for each wireline, there was a standby radio link. Radio communication consisted of three types of traffic: order, DF control and operational administrative messages. The Enigma machine was used with the special Heinrich setting with H standing for H-Dienst to encipher orders. Enigma machines in the larger code rooms had an attachment which permitted greater speed in enciphering and deciphering.
A brevity code was used in DF control traffic, and for the reporting of bearings and fixes by the DF stations. There were also code groups for the more frequently used names of aircraft types and Allied units. When used, this code was reciphered with a cypher table that was in most cases, changed every 14 days. These recipherment tables were compiled by cryptographic technicians of the regiment and their use approved by the Chi-Stelle. The overall time required to encipher, transmit and decipher these messages was one to three minutes. The application of cipher tables to plaintext text was forbidden.
In requesting bearings or inquiring into the serviceability of a direction-finder, the radio operators used 3-letter groups that were similar to Q codes.

- Sagefish Installations

These radio teleprinter units consisted of a powerful HF transmitter, a teleprinter cipher machine, usually a Siemens and Halske T52 and a special appliance to convey the electrical impulses from the secure teleprinter to the transmitter. Rhombic aerials were used at both ends of these links. This type of communication at distances over 600kilometres. It was only installed at higher headquarters.

- Radio Telephone

Intercept detachments, when located within 45 miles of the regimental headquarters and sited on high ground so that line of sight factor was maintained could use portable radio sets for communication. During the last weeks of the war the regiment was constricted into an ever narrower areas. The two-way voice radios enabled the regiment to maintain communication with its out-stations until the final surrender.

== Operations in the east ==
=== Luftwaffe operations in the east ===
The overall mission of the Luftwaffe Chi-Stelle on Soviet Front was the interception and identification of the Soviet Air Forces radio traffic.

To accomplish this mission, it was first necessary to determine the types of signal communication being used by the Soviets. For both Wireless telegraphy (WT) and Radiotelephone (RT), the high frequency band was used almost exclusively, the main exception being navigational aids, i.e. radio beacons, which were used on medium frequency. Until the end of 1942, only WT traffic was found, thereafter R/T was also employed, increased greatly from 1944 onwards. The Soviets used radar only to a small extent, beginning at the end of 1944. Almost all W/T traffic was encoded or enciphered.

From Germany's point of view, all Soviet W/T traffic could theoretically have been intercepted in one centrally located station. However, in practice, it was found, as is so often the case, that areas of [skip], interference and natural barriers precluded such a plan and led to the establishment of numerous intercept stations all along the front.

Cryptanalytic problems were solved by the use of a relatively large number of people, not a few of which were capable linguists and could also be used to translate the contents of decoded messages.

A further problem occasioned by the expansiveness of the front was how to communicate the results of radio intelligence to those units and headquarters which could make the best use of it. The recipients of such intelligence were the Chi-Stelle, the operations (German: Ic) of the Luftflotten together with their tactical units on the Soviet Front, and the signal intelligence services of the Army and Navy. Therefore, pains had to be taken either to site Chi-Stelle units in the immediate areas of such headquarters or at least in localities where good wire communications were available. Owing to the danger of interception, and delays caused by the necessity of enciphering messages, radio was considered only an auxiliary means of communication.

Problems encountered on the Eastern front were of such a nature that axiomatic Chi-Stelle procedures and processes could often not be put into effect as a whole, but instead usually as a compromise solution.

==== Development 1936 to 1941 ====
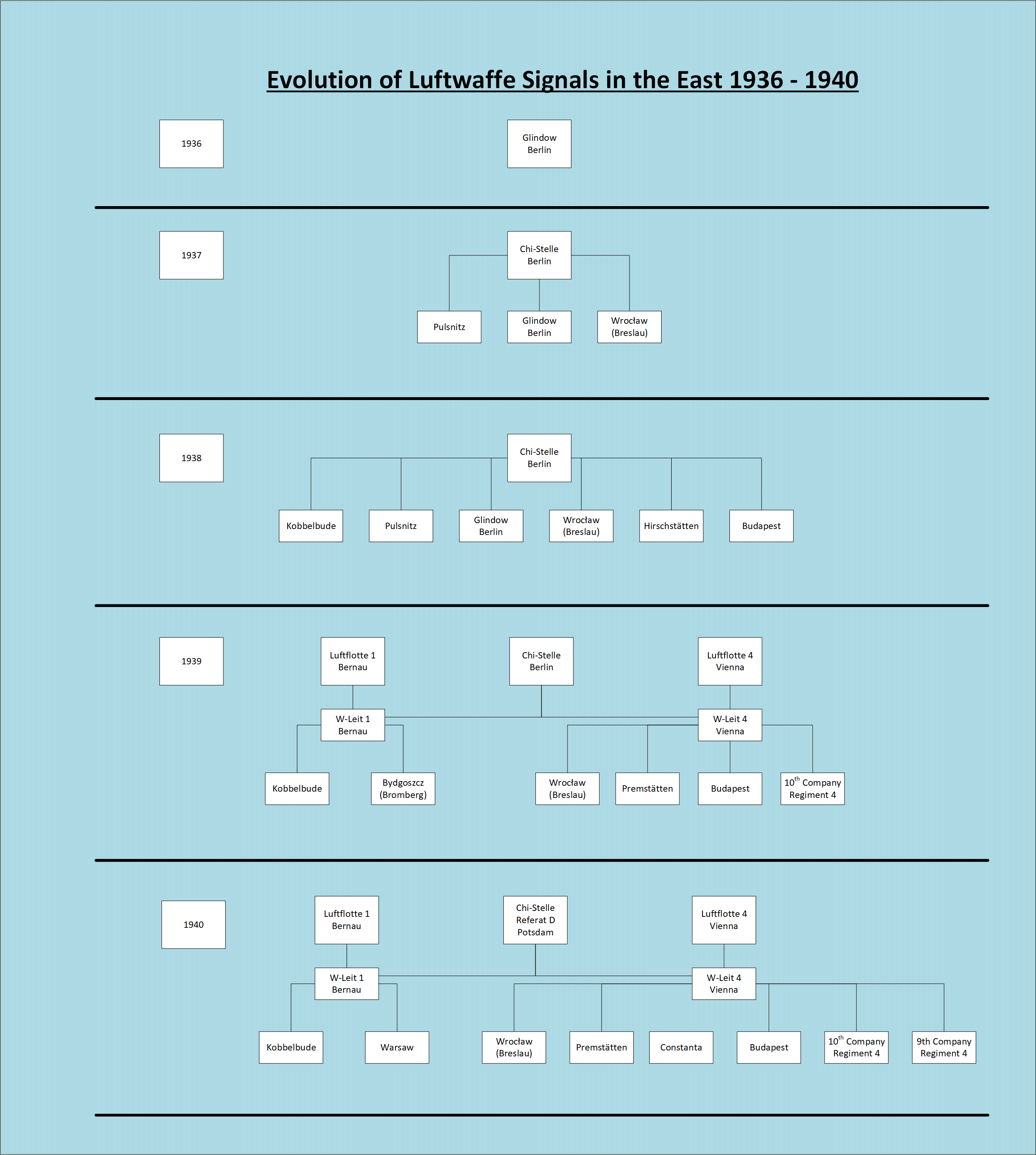
Evolution of Luftwaffe east signals units from 1936 to 1940.

Until the invasion of the Soviet Union on Sunday, 22 June 1941, interception of Soviet radio traffic was accomplished by several fixed outstations, each of which was assigned a prescribed area to monitor. In the summer of 1936, the first of these stations was established in Glindow, Berlin. During the year between 1937 and 1938, five further stations were established in Breslau, Pulsnitz, Bydgoszcz, Svetloye (Kobbelbude) and Hirschstätten. Each of these fixed outstations did its own preliminary evaluation work, with final evaluation still undertaken at the Chi-Stelle. The stations were operationally controlled by the Chi-Stelle but administratively by a Luftflotten in whose area they were located. Thus the stations in Hirschstätten and Wrocław were assigned to Luftnachrichten Regiment 4, and the remainder with Luftnachrichten Regiment 1.

This policy was a great mistake and remained a point of contention with signals personnel throughout the war. It meant that signals units were subordinated to two unit commanders, an impossible situation from the military point of view. Frequent differences of opinion arose between High Command headquarters, each wishing to be considered as the authority actually controlling the Chi-Stelle. The situation was often intolerable.

It soon became evident that the personnel and equipment available for the monitoring of Russian radio traffic, that was becoming constantly more extensive and complicated, were not sufficient. The Russian methods of assigning call signs and frequencies became more and more complex. Special complications resulted from the fact that each Russian air army implemented its own signal procedures and cryptography standards, that according to the ability of the individual Russian signals officers, making it either more or less difficult for the Luftwaffe Chi-Stelle. There were some Soviet air armies, that owing to the incompetence or negligence of the signals officers, were looked upon with a sort of affection by the Chi-Stelle, while there were others whose traffic could only be analysed by bringing to bear all the resources that the Luftwaffe had available.

The most difficult task of all was intercepts from the northern sector or lack thereof. This was due in part to the fact that good land-line communications existed in the Leningrad throughout the static warfare in that region.

Owing to ever present personnel problems in the unit, the organisation of the Chi-Stelle unit during 1938 was not significantly expanded in the east. Luftflotten 1 and Luftflotten 4 requested their own signals intelligence unit, and each wished to receive signal intercepts directly from the units located in its specified area, and not via the Chi-Stelle. In order to meet these requirements, W-Leitstellen were created in the summer of 1938 in the immediate vicinity of each Luftlotte concerned. It was intended that these Leitstellen render interim reports to the Luftflotten while expediting the intercepted material to the Chi-Stelle for further processing. The personnel, cryptanalysts and evaluations were drawn from the fixed signals outstations, and to a lesser extent from the Chi-Stelle. This withdrawal of personnel from an already weak organisation suffering from chronic staff shortages caused a deterioration in the unit, without any commensurate gain to the new entities.

In the summer of 1939, the Leitstellen, the fixed stations and the mobile intercept companies on the two sectors were combined into signals intelligence battalions of the respective Luftlotte signal regiments.

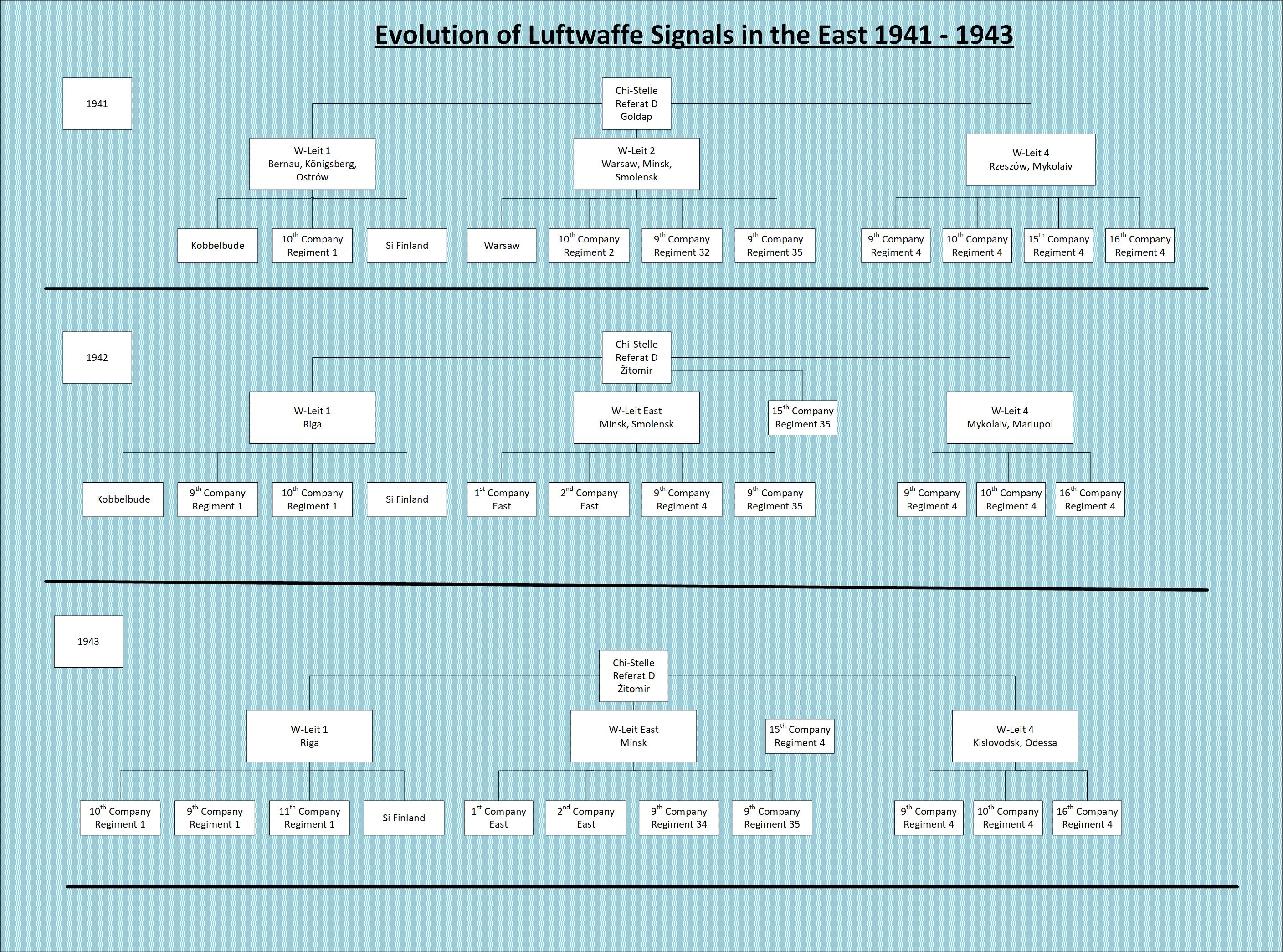
Evolution of Luftwaffe east signals units from 1941 to 1943.

When Germany invaded Poland, the Luftwaffe signals units in the east were ordered as follows:

- Referat D of the Chi-Stelle
- The 3rd Battalion of Luftnachrichten Regiment 1 consisted of:
  - W-Leit 1 in Bernau
  - Fixed intercept station in Kobbelbude
  - Fixed intercept station in Bromberg, that was transferred from Pulsnitz.
- The 3rd Battalion of Luftnachrichten Regiment 4 consisted of:
  - W-Leit 4 in Vienna
  - Fixed intercept station in Breslau
  - Fixed intercept station in Premstätten
  - 10th Company of LNR 4, newly activated and fought at the front during the Polish campaign.

At the conclusion of the Polish campaign, monitoring of Polish communications was discontinued. Its place was taken by the Balkan countries and Turkey, that were monitored from Vienna, Premstätten and Budapest.

In 1940 there were few changes. The fixed intercept station in Bromberg was moved to Warsaw. An intercept station and DF facility were erected in Kirkenes and the station in Budapest established a satellite outstation in Constanța. A new intercept company called the 9th Company of LNR 4 was activated.

This situation remained static until the invasion of the Soviet Union.

==== Signal Intelligence Regiment East organisation ====
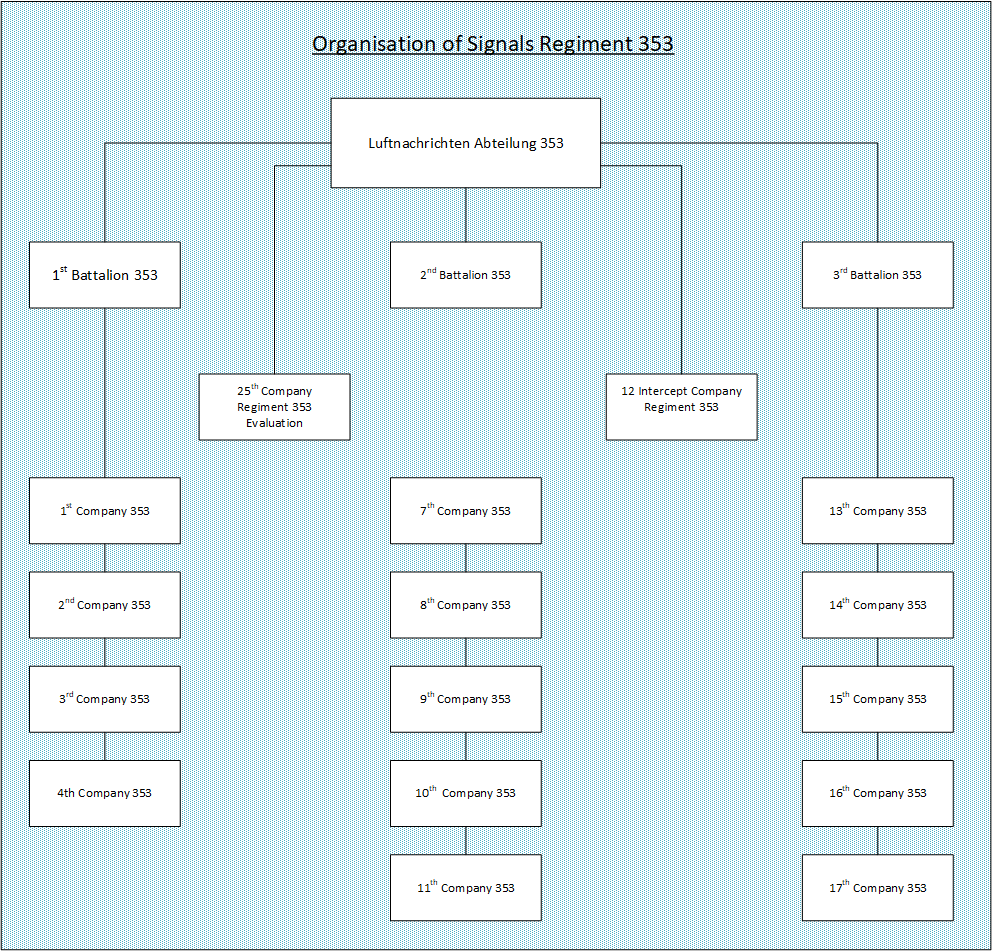
Organisation of LN Abteilung 355, autumn 1944

Luftnachrichten Abteilung 355 was activated in September 1944. The need on the part of the subordinate signals units for a more unified operational and administrative chain of command was only realised up to the level of regimental headquarters, and then only realised up to the level of regimental headquarters, and then only on paper, as the Chi-Stelle still continued to traffic directly with subordinate units of the regiment. The regiment still suffered from divided control, operationally subordinated to the Chi-Stelle, and administratively to the Chief Signal Officer through Generalmajor Willi Klemme, who was not a specialist administrative officer.

Luftnachrichten Abteilung 353 was organised as follows:

- Regimental headquarters with the 25th Evaluation Company and 12th Intercept Company in Cottbus
- 1st Battalion (north), formerly the 3rd Battalion of LNR 1, with four companies in East Prussia.
- 2nd Battalion (centre), formerly Signals Battalion East with five companies in Poland.
- 3rd Battalion (south), formerly the 3rd Battalion of LNR 4, with five companies in Austria.

All the battalions had numerous intercept and DF outstations along the entire front.

Owing to the Soviet advances, the regimental staff together with the 25th and 12th Companies moved to Dresden in mid-February 1945. From there as the Allies advanced into Germany, the group retired to Alpine Redoubt. In order to ensure the continuity of operations, a platoon of about 70 signals personnel were formed, comprising evaluators, intercepts and communication personnel. The platoon was fully mobile and carried the most necessary records and sufficient radio equipment for monitoring and communications purposes. It drove to Wagrain in the Northern Limestone Alps. The regimental headquarters and companies followed more slowly as they were not fully mobile.

In Wagrain, the 2nd and 3rd Battalions joined the regiment, so that with the exception of the 1st Battalion, that remained in north Germany, the regiment was reassembled.

After the surrender of Germany, the regiment proceeded via Zell am See and the Lake Chiemsee to the Luftwaffe concentration area at Aschbach in Austria. It was subsequently discharged.

==== Intercept and DF operations ====
Line of withdrawal of Luftwaffe signal units from the east to the west and back into Germany.

In the autumn of 1940, the construction of a large Rhombic antenna system was started, and once in operation, was to orientated to the east and south-east, for the purposes of exploring the possibilities of a central high frequency intercept stations. It was put into operations only shortly before the outbreak of the war with the Soviet Union in 1941 and good results were obtained. However, it was never fully manned.

The distribution of intercept receivers by type for the various monitoring tasks was made on a basis of the preferences of the individual signals units. It proved most advantageous, wherever possible, to assign a complete monitoring mission to a single company or outstation.

Great use was found for the HF DF, A-10F that used an Adcock antenna type. However, for a war of movement, it had to be made mobile. A good DF baseline, as well as an efficient method of controlling the operations of the DF's, was essential to the accomplishment of the regiment's mission. Special care had to be taken in planning D/F control by radio, which of course involved the encoding and decoding of messages, every second counted. The assignment of several targets to one D/F station proved unworkable.

==== Cryptanalysis ====
The problem of securing sufficient and well qualified cryptanalyst personnel was at all times very great, since almost all messages, that numbered between 1000 and 2000 per day, were enciphered. To mitigate this problem, Chi-Stelle attempted to produce and train cryptanalysts itself. It was found that cryptanalysis skills were an inborn talent, and approximately one half of the personnel trained were proved useful. The chief reason why there were never sufficient cryptanalysts available may be laid to a tendency on the part of those men to specialise in certain types of codes and cyphers. It was also usually impractical to detach cryptanalysts to the various intercept companies, which in the interested of tactical evaluation would be advantageous.

Cryptanalysts were mostly employed in the W-Leitstellen, or in evaluation companies where they, as well as evaluation personnel, were in close contact of Referat E, that suffered a chronic shortage of staff. The introduction of new codes and new recipher table for old codes presented constant challenges for the cryptanalysts.

An average of 60% to 70% of the 2-Figure, 3-Figure and 4-Figure messages were solved. 5-Figure messages often required painstaking analysis, and when solved were often not read in time to be of any strategic or tactical value.

==== Evaluation ====
- Traffic and Log Analysis for DF evaluation.

The principal duties of these sub-sections were the identification of all call signs and frequencies, and the reconstruction of Russian radio networks. A corollary duty was to determine the system used by the various Soviet air armies in selecting their call-signs and frequencies and to attempt prediction of those to be used in the future.

- Tactical and final evaluation

As per traffic analysis, preliminary evaluation was undertaken by a fixed intercept station and the mobile intercept companies. Traffic was then forwarded to the W-Leitstellen or the evaluation companies where the traffic was evaluated, and reports prepared that were sent to the Chi-Stelle, the Luftflotten and the Fliegerkorps. Later these battalion evaluation reports were also sent to the regimental evaluation company, where they were compiled into a comprehensive report from the Chi-Stelle, where they were edited and passed to the Luftwaffe and Wehrmacht HQ.

==== Signal communications ====
Excellent signal reception was absolutely essential to the Chi-Stelle. Experience from the Russian Front showed that the dissemination of intelligence from outstations to tactical aviation units had to be accomplished in a matter of minutes, and in some cases, seconds. For this reason, R/T stations of Signals Regiment East were located directly on the aerodrome of German fighter and reconnaissance units, and had direct wire lines to the fighter control centre. The out-stations were also tied to the teleprinter switchboards of the air bases in order that communication is maintained with the battalion and neighbouring R/T stations. The out-stations did not have the necessary means of installing their own telephone lines. They were furnished by the airbase commander. Radio links to the battalion were also maintained as a standby.

==== Liaison with the Army signals ====
As the external characteristics of Russian radio traffic were not sufficient to identify a group of new traffic as either Red Army or Soviet Air Forces it was necessary to maintain close liaison with the German Army cypher bureau, General der Nachrichtenaufklärung. Of primary importance was a liaison between the respective traffic analysis sections and for this purpose Non-commissioned liaison officers were frequently exchanged. During such periods when contact with the Army could not be maintained perhaps due to distances involved, the Luftwaffe Chi-Stelle was still able to identify traffic and execute traffic analysis.

=== Northern sector ===
==== Development up to the Luftwaffe invasion of Russia ====
In May 1941, Luftflotte 2 and its attached signals units, the 3rd Battalion of the Luftwaffe Signal Regiment was transferred to Warsaw. As the signals unit has no experience in monitoring and intercepting Russian traffic, the majority of the work was undertaken by the fixed station in Warsaw. The commitment of the Warsaw station increased again when W-Leit 2 was transferred to Italy in December 1942. To reinforce the Warsaw station, that was not fully prepared, W-Leit 1 in Bernau, seconded approximately one-third of its cryptanalysis and evaluation personnel to the Warsaw station. In the last half of 1944, the work of W-Leit 1 has attained such stature that its reports were forwarded by Referat D to the General Staff virtually unaltered.

Shortly before the beginning of the war with the Soviet Union, the 3rd Battalion of LNR 1 in Bernau moved with the Luftflotte to Königsberg. At the outbreak of World War II, the battalion was composed of:

- W-Leit 1
- Fixed station in Kobbelbude, with several out-stations
- A small intercept and DF station in Kirkenes

In addition, the Fliegerkorps subordinated to Luftflotte 1 had a signals company that monitored Russian air activity that was of specific interest to the unit. This company, was lacking in experienced personnel, was considered inefficient and to a great extent had to rely upon the support of the battalion. Much later in the war, it was amalgamated into the battalion.

These signals units were linked together by wired communications lines, to the Luftflotte that was only a few kilometres distant, the fixed intercept station in Warsaw, the Chi-Stelle station itself and the advanced echelon which had moved to East Prussia.

The order of battle and strength of Russian air units were already known from work done during peace-time, with all signals people being alerted during the night of 21 June 1941 as to what they might expect to find in Russian radio traffic. However, no change occurred in call signs, frequencies of transmission, codes or cyphers. Nevertheless, there was much chaos and confusion manifested in the great number of plain text messages that were received, the state of readiness gradually improved, but lasted for several weeks, and can be attributed to the continuous withdrawal of the Russians. Radio traffic was not as plentiful as Chi-Stelle wished, the reason being that there were satisfactory land-lines on the northern sector.

==== Operations ====
As Germany advanced into the Soviet Union in July 1941, Luftflotte 1 and W-Leit 1 moved to Dvinsk in Latvia. As it became increasingly evident that personnel and equipment were not sufficient for the task at hand, a request to increase the strength of the battalion was submitted, and in the middle of July 1941 a signals company arrived. This company had had previous experience in the East in 1939, and became operational in a few weeks.

After a three-week stay in Dvinsk, the battalion moved in Luftflotte 1 to Ostrov. Another company was created out of existing personnel, such that from August 1942 to December 1942, the battalion consisted of the following units:

- W-Leit 1
- Two intercept companies in the direct vicinity of W-Leit 1, together with satellite out-stations and DF units.
- Fixed intercept station in Kobbelbude.
- Smaller fixed station in Kirkenes.

A small intercept station in Mikkeli, with two out-stations, one in central Finland, the other on Lake Ladoga. This station was created after the entry of Finland into the war, and lengthened the DF base line.

Use was also made of the Finnish Signals Intelligence Office, Viestitiedustelutoimisto, whose work was considered to be of a high standard within the German cryptography community. The Luftwaffe station in Finland had either wire or radio links with W-Leit 1 in Ostrov. Additional DF equipment was established in the northern sector in order to obtain more favourable DF cuts. Some of these were placed in the area of the central sector.

During the period of transition, by augmenting its personnel in order to meet the increasing demands made upon it, the battalion was able to provide a flawless picture of the Soviet Air Force in the northern sector.

In early 1941, owing to administration difficulties and problems with billets, part of the Luftflotte, including the operations office, and the signals battalion, moved from their location in Ostrov to Riga in Latvia. In Riga, W-Leit 1 was located close to the Luftflotte, while the two intercept companies were positioned to the east of the city.

In autumn 1942, the Luftflotte withdrew to East Prussia, close to Kobbelbude, where the fixed intercept station was located. In February 1945, advancing Soviet troops forced the battalion to withdraw, via land and sea to the island of Rügen. The stations in Finland were closed, and the personnel withdrew. In January 1945, the battalion returned to Lübeck where it surrendered to the British Army.

==== Intercept ====
W/T interception was the most important in the first stages of the war. The area covered extended from the Arctic Sea to a region slightly north of Moscow.

In the autumn of 1942, the battalion started to take an interest in Russian High-frequency R/T, as this traffic was becoming more prevalent as the war progressed. Two R/T stations were established on German fighter airfields, one south of Leningrad, the other south-west of Lake Ilmen. This was done primarily to increase the rapidity with which these units received intelligence derived from Russian fighter traffic. However, it was found that from 1942 onwards that careful processing of RT traffic afforded valuable information on the strength and order of battle of Russian Air Force.

When the battalion withdrew to East Prussia in June 1944 these two outstations were left behind. A few months later it became necessary to establish another RT detachment in Courland. Later, the two out-stations left in Russia also withdrew to this area and continued operations even though Courland was cut off. Part of the personnel of these RT detachments later fell into Russian hands.

The battalion was responsible for covering the traffic of the Russian Baltic Fleet Air Arm. To assist in this task an RT detachment was placed aboard the German cruiser Prinze Eugen. This RT unit followed the activities of the Russian Baltic Fleet aircraft in order to warn German shipping of impending attack. This work assumed even greater importance after Courland had been cut off and was relying mainly on supplies by sea.

With autumn 1944 approaching, RT intercept had far surpassed WT in importance and was supplying 70%–80% of the intelligence obtained by the battalion. The Russian 1st, 3rd and 15th Air Armies used RT almost exclusively, which meant that at least one RT out-station had to be allocated to cover each of these air armies. Good communication between these detachments and the battalion were therefore of the essence.

Russian radar stations on the northern sector were located mainly in the Leningrad-Kronstadt-Levansaari area, and later on also along the Baltic coast, especially in the Revel and Kemel areas. Two radar intercept detachments were allocated to the battalions by the Radar Intercept Control Centre in Berlin, and these units monitored Russian radar activity in the Leningrad area from April 1943 to June 1944.

In March 1945, Russian radar stations began to use RT for reporting purposes. During Russian daylight fighter sweeps, the fighter control stations were informed of any German fighter reaction as revealed by radar. The signals out-stations monitoring this traffic were able to warn German aircraft of their impending danger.

==== Evaluation ====
Signals was a unique and therefore important source of intelligence to the Luftwaffe. Movements of Russian units, the occupation of airfields, the number of serviceable aircraft, and the location of supply dumps were determined from the monitoring of point to point traffic. Russian offensive intentions were also determined from traffic intercepted on these networks. Thus, for example, a Russian order to bomber units was intercepting ordering an attack on Shavli in Lithuania, where an entire German Panzer Army had been immobilised through lack of fuel. The signals reported this to the Luftwaffe, which provided fighters for the intercept of the Russian bombers, while Junkers Ju 52s dropped petrol containers to the encircled army. Such signals successes occurred from time to time.

With the stabilizing of the northern front, the volume of Soviet radio traffic shrank. Nevertheless, a substantial number of messages still were intercepted daily. Signals were almost the only source of intelligence on the Russian situation, as agent's reports and other forms of intelligence were for the most part lacking.

On occasion, the signals battalion furnished intelligence to the Luftwaffe operations which went unheeded, e.g. in the autumn of 1941, when Germany was striving to effect a junction with the Finnish troops at Tikhvin, certain radio characteristics appeared in traffic on this sector that two weeks previously had been noted in traffic from Siberia. This was taken by signals intelligence as an indication that the Russian troops had been transferred in this short interval from Siberia to a sector south of Tichvin. The German command maintained that this was impossible, and did not react to this intelligence. The Russians attacked in great force and won a significant victory. The railway between Leningrad and Moscow was thus liberated by the Russians, and the Germans were forced to take up positions on the Volkhov Front, leaving the hedgehog redoubt of Demyansk to its fate. The junction with the Finns never materialised.

The signals station in Kirkenes which suffered with the Finnish SI station from auroral interference in its radio reception, nevertheless derived satisfactory intelligence for the German headquarters on the Kurmansk Front, especially that concerning convoys to and from Archangel. The latter was reported to the bomber units and the navy.

Similarly successful were the Finnish signals stations in monitoring the Finnish Front and the northern sector of the Leningrad Front. The Finnish and German signals worked in closest cooperation.

==== Liaison ====
Even before the start of the war, the commanding officer of the battalion had maintained unofficial liaison with the army and navy signals unit. Frequent visits were exchanged which resulted in a reciprocity of intelligence exchange. This liaison became closer as time went on, and all three branches of the Wehrmacht were able to give each other very important intelligence and avoid unnecessary duplication of work. Naturally, close liaison was also currently maintained with the other Luftwaffe signals battalions on the Eastern Front.

=== Central sector ===
==== Organisation and development ====
Before the start of the Eastern campaign, the fixed signals stations in Warsaw, W-21 worked on traffic of the Russian Air Force. When the war in the east became imminent, W-Leit 2 also was moved to Warsaw with Luftflotte 2 as reinforcement for the expected military operations. Up to the time of the move, W-Leit 2 had worked on British air traffic exclusively. Since it was inexperienced in Russian traffic, the full monitoring burden fell upon W-21 during the first months of the great offensive in the east. Conditions were made very difficult through lack of sufficient personnel and transport, as the campaign was then moving very fast.

W-21 and W-Leit 2 were moved from Warsaw to Minsk and later in October 1941 to Smolensk. In December 1941, Luftflotte 2 and its signals battalions were withdrawn and sent to Italy.

W-21 and the signals company of V Fliegerkorps had to cover all of the central sector Russian air traffic during the severe winter of 1941–1942, under the most difficult conditions. This coverage was performed from Smolensk. Owing to difficulties in administrations of the signals company of V Fliegerkorps and W-21, it was decided to combine them and form the Signals Battalion, East. At this time the Fliegerkorps V changed its name to Luftflotte east.

The signals battalion furnished all its intelligence reports to Luftflotte operations and worked directly under the Chief Signal Officer of the Luftflotte Staff.

In Smolensk, there was also a German Army signals regiment. This regiment covered Russian Air Force traffic. The coverage of air traffic by this regiment was even greater than that of the Luftwaffe signals intelligence. Every effort was made by the battalion to rectify this matter, and in the course of four months, this was accomplished through additional intercept personnel, transfer of the intercept site to an area of better reception, retraining of personnel, and reorganisation of and closer cooperation between the evaluation, deciphering and intercept elements. In September 1942, the army signals ceased monitoring Russian Air Force traffic, and all intelligence reports on the Russian Air Force were handled by the battalion.

The coverage of the battalion increased so rapidly that in a very short time, it was unable to cover all commitments without having again to increase personnel and equipment. These commitments arose from air-to-ground traffic, which up to this time had not been covered. It necessitated the creation of a DF network, RT outstations and a fighter warning service for German long-range reconnaissance. The ensuring requests for additional personnel and equipment were granted, in most cases by the Luftflotte in consideration of the importance of the mission and the value attached to signals reports. At this time the battalion compromised two intercept companies and one Evaluation Company. Only one of the companies was fully mobile, the other two had only a minimum of vehicles.

When the bulge in the German line in front of Smolensk was eliminated by the Russians, the battalion together with the now renamed Luftflotte 6 moved to Orsha in August 1943, and two weeks later again moved, this time to Minsk.

In Minsk, the battalion was ideally located in a large school and enjoyed excellent radio reception. The move was made in echelons, and coverage of Russian traffic was carried on during the move. The battalion functioned very smoothly, and took little time to become completely operational at the new location (Fig 4).

During October 1943 in Minsk, the battalion received the fourth company. This intercept company was formerly with a Fliegerkorps on the southern sector and was fully mobile. The addition of this intercept company enabled the use of fifty-five receivers on Russian WT traffic.

Each of the companies in the battalion had its allotted work. The 1st company was charged with all deciphering and evaluation. The 2nd company was assigned coverage of Russian air force point-to-point networks. Between 500 and 900 messages were intercepted daily, which were processed by the 1st company and read with 60–70% success. The 3rd company monitored Russian long-range bomber traffic. For fighter traffic, RT outstations of this company were attached to German fighter units and worked on at the latter's bases. The 4th company monitored the Soviet Air Defence Forces (PVO). This involved WT and RT traffic of the Russian fighter arm defending critical railway junctions and industrial centres. Also monitored were the flak and air raid warning networks, radio beacons, and radar. The RT outstations also warned German long-range reconnaissance aircraft of the approach of Russian fighters. The work in Minsk continued for about 10 months and was considered very successful.

In June 1944, the battalion moved with Luftflotte 6 from Minsk to Warsaw and in August to the vicinity of Łódź. While there, a fifth intercept company was added and the battalion was fully employed for another six months. [ Fig no. 5].

The chain of command of signals battalions was generally changed several times during the war without attaining a satisfactory solution. Even the final reorganisation into signals regiments, with separate operational and administrative commands over them, did not prove at all successful.

The Fliegerkorps organisation and Luftflotten Ic operation, several times attempted to have the signals units serving them subordinated to them, rather than the signal corps, as these units were their prime source of intelligence. The realisation of such a plan which met with stiff resistance in signal quarters might have had a detrimental effect on the work of signals intelligence since a not inconsiderable part of this service devoted itself to the interests of combat units rather than to those of the Ic operations. Moreover, a signals battalion with its radio receivers, DF and other signal equipment would have proved too much of a technical problem for Ic.

Signals Intelligence Battalion East grew with an increased volume of Russian traffic, but from the very first was always able to solve the intricate problems presented. Lack of caution was in no small way responsible for many problems and the following illustrates the point. A certain German general, in a public interview, told the press that his success in breaking out of an encirclement by Russian troops was directly attributable to the knowledge of the disposition of opposing Russian forces, obtained from signal intelligence.

The effect of this interview was directly felt by the Chi-Stelle as such declarations inevitably brought about a complete change of Russian codes and cyphers. Despite these difficulties, signals were able to surmount all problems, owing largely to the fact that from the beginning it had followed Russian forces most closely, and could again pick up the threads, even following such drastic changes.

The battalion was always given the utmost consideration in its equipment and personnel needs, by the Luftflotte. Several times the Luftflotte commander himself came to the assistance of the battalion, owing to his great interest in the work.

==== Operations ====
===== Intercept cover =====
It was found that by giving the intercept companies a special area and type of Allied aircraft to work on, they became highly efficient and developed a real spirit of competition that proved most useful in this work.

The following types of traffic were covered:

- Point-to-point traffic of the Russian air armies. In the central sector, there were 25 WT received for the Russian point-to-point networks. 15 search sets were used to locate new and changed frequencies. One receiver was used to cover a small group of rather unimportant networks. This mission was performed by one WT intercept company which did not have its own evaluation section.

- Point-to-point traffic of the Russian air defence units. This traffic comprised networks of Russian fighter divisions, flak and air raid warning service. There were 10 receivers of another WT company allotted to this task. This company also covered the RT of the Russian defensive fighter arm, and had small detachments of three to four sets, manned by Russian speaking operatives at three air bases used by German long-range reconnaissance Groups. In addition, the company covered Russian radar and radio beacons and was equipped to do its own evaluation.

- Air to ground WT traffic of Russian long-range bombers (ADD). Twenty receivers were allotted to this traffic during periods of activity, and an additional 10 receivers were used to cover the point-to-point networks on which operational orders were transmitted. These duties were performed by a third WT Intercept Company, which also had its own evaluation company.

- Air to ground RT traffic of Russian fighters and fighter bombers. The company that performed this work was prepared to send teams of men and sets to advanced German fighter airfields. These teams, possessing six radio sets and Russian speaking operators, were sent to fighter Gruppen and worked directly with these units. Their reports were also sent to the battalion evaluation company for incorporation in the overall intelligence picture.

The battalion had a total of 120 receivers, with the majority always in operation.

For WT intercept the radio receiver, Type A was used, however, there was a shortage of this types, so Type B was also used. Both of these sets were standard Luftwaffe equipment. Type B was not as efficient as the A in that it did not possess selectivity of the latter. For RT intercept, the high frequency C receiver was used. There were a few power orientated K receivers used on this sector, but these sets were not generally liked by the operators. It was found that better results were obtained by letting the operators pick their own type of set to work with, and this was done wherever possible.

Most of the radio sets were intended to be operated with dry cell batteries but for practical reasons, these were converted to wet cell battery operation by 100 volt storage batteries taken from vehicles. Two batteries were used for each set, one being charged while the other was being used.

===== DF operations =====
The battalion had five WT DF units, six RT DF units, three MF DFs, and three radar intercept DFs. This number was not deemed adequate for the work at hand.

===== Evaluation =====
- Traffic and Log Analysis: DF evaluation
  - These sections, grouped together and headed by an officer analysed WT traffic and call-signs. They also assigned frequencies to be covered by the intercept units.
- Cryptanalysts
  - The deciphering section was also headed by an officer. It deciphered intercepted messages and developed new cryptanalytic techniques.
- Contents Evaluation
  - This section analysed the contents of messages and maintained files on all information referring to order of battle, location or airfields, personalities and so on and passed this information on to the final evaluation section.
- Final Evaluation
  - This section compiled all reports issued by the battalion.

===== Signal communication =====
A good communication system is most essential to signals work, in that it provides the means for immediate dissemination of all pertinent information. For security purposes, the use of radio must be limited. Excellent wire communication existed from the out-stations to the evaluation company, and from the battalion to command HQ. Each out-station had a teleprinter link with the battalion, as well as a standby radio channel. The battalion was equipped with a large telephone switchboard, with trunk service to outstations and command headquarters. The battalion had a number of direct lines, among which were lines to Luftflotte 6, Signal Regiment East, Referat D of the Chi-Stelle and to the nearest Luftwaffe exchange.

The battalion had its own teleprinter installation with both standard and secure teleprinter machines. These were tied into the Luftwaffe exchange and to the special signals teleprinter network. The latter network provided communication with the Chi-Stelle, regimental headquarters, and the other two battalions of the regiment.

During raids of t Russian long-range bombers, permanent telephone connections were established to the other signals battalions over a distance of 300-500Kilometres which were maintained for the duration of the raid.

A battalion signal officer was appointed to be responsible for the smooth functioning of all signal communication, including the distribution of cypher systems. This was usually the commanding officer of one of the intercept companies since these companies possessed the greater part of the signal equipment.

A technical inspector of the battalion staff, in conjunction with the radio repair sergeants of the intercept companies, was responsible for all signal maintenance and repair.

===== General comments =====
- It was found that operations were performed most efficiently when battalion could be centrally located and long lines of communication were not needed to outstations, DF stations and command HQ.
- Battalion moves always adversely affected operations, and it would have been more advantageous to allow the battalion to remain in one location, and provide communication lines and a signals liaison officer to the Ic operations of the Luftflotte, instead of insisting that the battalion be in the immediate vicinity of the Luftflotte.

==== Liaison ====
===== With local signals battalions =====
Close liaison between battalions was of extreme importance, as intercept cover overlapped. Through proper liaison many important points and valuable information exchanged on new traffic, unallocated stations to listen to and cryptanalytic solutions. The importance of immediate liaison was found e.g. when Russian bombers flew past more than one battalion.

===== German night fighter units =====
Cooperation with the Luftwaffe night fighter arm in the central sector provided good results. The signals battalion maintained a liaison officer at the night fighter control centre who received all signal intelligence data related to fixes, course, strength and probably targets of Russian bombers. Considering the paucity of Russian long-range bombing missions, the results obtained were quite satisfactory. For example, during a Russian attack on Tilsit that was closely followed by signals, German night fighters were able to shoot down 14 Russian bombers out of 100 that participated in the raid. During their next attack, the Russian bombers maintained the strictest radio silence, an indication that they realised the reason for their previous losses.

===== Long range reconnaissance units =====
A fighter warning service was maintained, similar to those in the west and south to advice reconnaissance crews of an impending attack from Russian fighters. The intelligence source for this service was the prolific Russian fighter R/T traffic, but compared to the fighter warning services in the other two theatres, it was considered rather primitive.

===== Day fighters =====
The support of German day fighters was one of the primary functions of signals on the central sector of the Eastern Front. For this reason, a policy of close cooperation was carefully nurtured on both sides. SIS out-stations, commanded by an officer and attached to fighter Geschwader or Gruppen, unusually maintained their operations room in the same building as the fighter control. By means of direct liaison between the commanding officer of signals unit and the fighter control chief, all operational matters to which signals might pertain were discussed. Signals served to instruct German fighter pilots on the combat tactics of Russian fighters and fighter bombers.

===== Luftflotte headquarters =====
In the east it was particularly difficult for the Ic operations of the Luftflotte to obtain information on the Allied situation. Reliable agents' reports were intermittent and photographic intelligence was seldom accurate, owing to excellent camouflage of which the Russians were masters. Moreover, it was dependent on the weather and towards the end of the war was rendered more difficult by the stiffening of Russian air defence. That the Ic, nevertheless, was able to boast an accurate picture of the Allied situation at all times was the result of the work of signals intelligence. Everything possible was done to further close liaison between the Ic and the signals battalion.

The battalion forwarded one of its most capable junior officers to the office of the Luftflotte Ic as a signals liaison officer. The latter usually had a direct telephone line to the battalion final evaluation section.

To assist the evaluation work, the Ic included the signals battalion in the distribution of all daily reports and appreciations prepared by his office. These included:

- A list of all missions flown by the Luftlotte, including results of the mission.
- A list of all hostile aircraft plotted by radar and visual observation.
- Coverage of airfields by photo reconnaissance.
- Locations of radio stations and radar installations from photo reconnaissance.
- A report of the ground situation as issued by the Army.
- Prisoner of War Interrogation reports of Russian aircrews.

Russian airborne radio operators were interrogated by the battalion at first hand and all captured documents dealing with Russian signal matters were sent to the battalion. The furnishing of this important collateral intelligence to the signals battalions greatly facilitated its evaluation work. Those situations were obviated where the evaluation section may halt due to a problem that had already been clarified by accurate PW testimony. The analysis of Russian radio traffic, intercepted in conjunction with a German attack, was simplified if exact details concerning the attack were available to the German evaluation company.

All intelligence obtained by the battalion was passed to Ic by the signals liaison officer. At 6:00 pm daily, a secret signals intelligence report was prepared by a specially assigned and trusted evaluator. This report was sent by courier to the Luftflotte where it was available for the Commanding Generals war room conference, which took place each evening. Messages of tactical importance were passed to the Luftflotte as soon as they were obtained. On the basis of these daily reports, aggregate fortnightly report that emphasised long-range changes and new developments in the Russian situation during the period. The daily signals reports, together with other intelligence available, formed the basis for an Allied intelligence report prepared by the Ic and distributed to tactical units without revealing the sources of the material. 80% of the contents of this report was derived from signal intelligence.

The daily and fortnightly reports on the battalion were also sent by teleprinter to regimental headquarters and to Referat D of the Chi-Stelle.

===== Conclusions =====
Signals intelligence in the east was the prime source of Allied intelligence. Reports of the Russian Air Force units, special concentrations and warnings of impending attacks could always be timely and accurately stated. There were no important Russian attacks, that signals did not recognise early enough, that preparations could not be arranged.

Unit strength, availability of fuel and ammunition, serviceability of airfields and aerodromes as well as impending attacks on railways, bridges, factories and so on, were determined from solved messages. Signals on several occasions were able to predict in advance the time and course of America heavy bomber formations flying over the Russian lines, and also at which fields these units would land, e.g. Poltava.

The work of the RT out-stations with German fighter Geschwader was alone responsible for shooting down over 1000 Russian aircraft in the central sector.

Reconnaissance units often called the battalion by telephone after landing and expressed their thanks for the service rendered by the signals, stating that without this assistance they would have been unable to complete their mission.

During the first period of the war, reports from signals were so radical to High Command that they were initially distrustful of them, and made only the most cautious use of them. Later the situation changed, and came to believe in signals and radio intelligence implicitly, and hailed it as the most reliable and opulent source of Allied intelligence.

=== Southern sector ===
==== Organisation and development ====
===== Origins in the east =====
The development of the Luftwaffe signals units in the east began in 1936 with fixed intercept and DF stations which were mainly used by civilian personnel. The first operational territories were Czechoslovakia, Poland and the Soviet Union. Referat D of the Chi-Stelle was in command of signals intelligence in the east.

===== Development of the southern sector at the start of the invasion of the Soviet Union =====
After the Anschluss, and the annexation of Austria to the German Reich in 1938, the Heeresnachrichtenamt, the Austrian cipher bureau, was incorporated into the Luftwaffe. Austrian personnel were used mainly at two new stations, W-Leit 4 in Vienna and W-14 in Hirschstetten, Vienna. Stations in Hungary were organised in October 1938 under the cover name of Operation Stephen. In spring 1939, all signals intercept stations were organised as a battalion under command of W-Leit 4. After the forming of the Luftflotte 4 Signal Regiment, the 3rd battalion of the regiment became a signals battalion. At the beginning of the war, the following units comprised the battalion:

- W-Leit 4, an evaluation company
- One mobile signals company
- Three fixed signals intercept stations

The signals company was reinforced by certainly experienced personnel from the fixed signals intercept stations. There was no central training of signals intercept operators. The battalion, therefore, instructed recruits during their training for the special tasks that needed to be undertaken. From the newly trained personnel, a second signals company was created in early 1940. Later a signals school for the battalion was established in Premstätten for the training for replacements. Radio operators allotted to the battalion received signals and cryptography training at the unit. The battalion covered the Soviet Union, Czechoslovakia until the invasion, Yugoslavia, Romania, Greece and Turkey. All these monitoring operations under the aegis of Luftflotte 4 were handled by an intercept company in Constanța. The main points of the observation focused on events that could ensure the success of military operations.

From Czechoslovakia, weather traffic, safety service networks and some artillery fire-control weather were intercepted. The order of battle of the Czech Air Force and the extent of occupation of their airfields was known. After the occupation of Czechoslovakia, it was found that the Czechoslovakia cypher bureau had solved a Wehrmacht code called German: Kammsschlüssel, and was reading it easily. Consequently, followed a greater limitation of the use of Wehrmacht low-grade codes.

In Romania, air force traffic and the police networks were monitored. The police code was solved, but the reports contained therein were of no interest. Monitoring of Romania ceased in spring 1941 and was not resumed until the Royal coup occurred that transferred the loyalty of the country to the Allies in 1944.

The monitoring of Turkey was considered a success. Strength and deployment of its air forces were known and its codes read. Turkish RT traffic was also intercepted.

Special attention was paid to the Soviet Union and very early the results of this monitoring gave valuable information to the signals intelligence and pilots of the Luftflotte 4. When the war started, signals on the southern sector was prepared.

==== Operations ====
===== Poland and Balkans =====
- Polish Campaign

No change took place to the fixed signals intercept stations. One mobile company and a special detachment of the Chi-Stelle were used in Poland. The results were meagre. The weather and safety service networks revealed little intelligence other than what airfields were being used. Sometimes artillery fire-control traffic was intercepted on WT and RT.

- Yugoslavia Campaign

The Royal Yugoslav Army Air Force was monitored by two fixed signals intercept stations and one company. The Royal Yugoslav Army Air Force code was known and all traffic could be read during the entire German war effort. As a result of signals, all Yugoslavian operations were known by the Oberkommando der Luftwaffe sufficiently in advance to take countermeasures.

- Greek Campaign

One fixed signals intercept station, one company, and one signals company of the Fliegerkorps III monitored Greece. The Hellenic Air Force codes were known and operations were successfully covered.

===== Soviet Union =====
At the beginning of the campaign, the mission of the battalion was to monitor the Soviet Air Force in the area of Luftflotte 4. The following signals units were used:

- W-Leit 4
- 4 signals companies
- one fixed signals intercept station.

The battalion also had operational control of the signal companies of the Fliegerkorps. The request of Luftwaffe signals intelligence to incorporate those Fliegerkorps companies into the signals battalions was met by the strongest resistance on the part of the Fliegerkorps and did not materialise on the southern sector, until the end of 1944. The fact that the signals intelligence had operational control of the Fliegerkorps signal companies, but was not aware of their movements when the Fliegerkorps unit moved, caused considerable difficulties.

At the beginning of the war, the battalion had 90 WT receivers in operation, which were considered sufficient. The geographical dispersion of the companies of the battalion made centralised control very difficult. For this reason, all mobile companies of the battalion were concentrated in Nikolayev in September 1941 and remained with Luftflotte 4, and from there, in turn in the same year to Kislovodsk. Owing to the impracticability of administering the companies located near Rzeszów and Constanța due to the distance involved, they were transferred to the Chi-Stelle battalion. During the German retreat, the battalion moved back to Mariupol in January 1943; a month later it moved to Kryvyi Rih, and in April 1943 to Kamianske to ensure better communication with the Luftflotte. By autumn 1943, it was moved back to Nikolayev.

The signals battalion of Luftflotte Don that had been activated in autumn 1942 was dissolved in December 1943. One of its companies was temporarily attached to the signals battalion of Luftflotte 4. By February 1944, the battalion had reached Odessa, but Allied attacks required a further move to Bacău. Communication difficulties prompted another move from Hungary to Debrecen, Turkey in April 1944. Two signal companies of the Fliegerkorps and the old company in Constanța were returned to the battalion in the summer of 1944. Frequent air attacks forced the battalion to retreat to Horn, Austria. One company was left with the Luftflotte. This was done to assure immediate intelligence to the Luftflotte so that it could undertake prompt countermeasures as required. Had the company moved with the battalion, this service would not have been available in the timely manner required, as communication over long distances was difficult and frequently disrupted. At the end of April the battalion moved to Münzkirchen. The last move was to Tauplitz on 4 May 1945, where operations ceased at 1200 hours on 8 May 1945.

===== Operational details =====
- Interception

The monitoring of fixed frequency bands at first allocated to each receiver proved impractical and was very soon abandoned. Thereafter each technician was given a specific network to cover. This enabled the technician to recognise a network by the characteristic tone of the opponent's transmission, and fist of the operator, even though the frequencies and call signs had been changed. This considerably facilitated the work of the traffic analysis section. Search receivers were operated over certain frequency bands. The monitoring of radio beacons and long-range bomber formations were done with receivers assigned especially for this work.

- Direction finding

At the beginning of the war with Russia, there already existed a fixed DF network, which soon proved inadequate and had to be replaced. By the use of mobile Adcock (A-70F Elektrola) which could be moved according to requirements, a good DF baseline was speedily established.

In order that this network operated smoothly, a system of control had to be devised. In the beginning, every DF unit worked independently, being assigned targets by the nearest intercept station. This resulted in line bearings only being taken, in consequence, definite fixes were very rare. It was soon found that centralised control of the DF units had to be brought about in order to achieve better results. Radio communication was established to the DF stations since wire communication was technically impossible. The battalion assigned targets to DF outstations, which reported the bearings back to the battalion. Despite some successes, these DF control procedures were not up to the standard required. The battalion later worked out a new DF control procedure, which later came to be used over the whole Eastern Front. Targets averaged approximately 300 per day, resulting in about 80 useful fixes. The DF control procedure proved especially useful in DF-ing approaching Allied flight formations.

In autumn 1944, the DF outstations received an additional Adcock each. The use of two DF's in each unit had the following advantages:

- A greater degree of accuracy.
- Point-to-point and air-to-ground traffic could be covered at the same time.
- One DF unit could work at all times despite frequent moves.

The DF-ing of Radio Telephone traffic was done at first by High Frequency close-range DF kit of Czech manufacture, and by the German PN 57N, neither of which were successful. Later on, Adcock installations were satisfactorily used in RT DF-ing. The RT DF stations were manned by personnel from the signals companies of the Fliegerkorps. The RT intercept stations of the battalion were also equipped with Adcock. A speedy operation was particularly essential because of the brevity of Allied fighter and fighter-bombers missions. Transmissions of DF results by WT was too slow. Telephone communications between outstations became necessary, and it was established by the Fliegerkorps or Luftwaffe.

The battalion had no medium frequency DF units. The safety service DF detachments of the Luftflotte provided any necessary bearings on Soviet radio beacons. Requests for bearings were transmitted on WT to the individual DF detachments by the safety service control. Non-commissioned officers, on detachment service from the battalion, directed the DF network, and performed the evaluation of the results.

- RT interception

RT interception on the southern sector of the Eastern Front was not intensively pursued until the spring of 1943. Previous intercept attempts against the Russian Air Force met only slight success in contrast to the northern, re Saint Petersburg (then Leningrad) and central Moscow sectors, where large volumes of R/T traffic, air-to-air and air-to-ground, permitted successful operation. Russian fighter and fighter-bomber formations in the south were poorly equipped, and in the beginning, many missions were flown without any radio equipment.

Luftwaffe RT intercept out-stations on the Crimean peninsula, and the Caucasus had only insignificant success. Russian ground forces used RT, and this traffic was monitored by the intercept companies of the German Army. Only upon request of High Command did the signal units of the Luftwaffe monitor Russian Army RT, e.g. during the Kerch Offensive. The first fighter units of the Russian Air Force to use RT to a considerable extent operated over the Kuban bridgehead in May 1943. These aircraft were fitted with transmitters and significant air to ground and air to air traffic was intercepted, and it was here that the southern sector intercept units had their first real success. The outstations were located on the airfields of fighter units. The strength of the outstations varied, as a minimum, four receivers were employed. The evaluation was undertaken in the fighter control centre and findings immediately passed to the duty officer, and provided tactical and sometimes strategic intelligence. Traffic data were compiled for weeks in advance and given to the outstations.

- Radar interception

Radar interception started in the summer of 1943, as the Allied's intention to increase his use of radar was anticipated. Successes were insignificant as the Russians had not kept pace with the development of radar. Some installations were plotted, however. In some Russian traffic, radar installations were referred to as Americans. It was arranged that additional radar intercept coverage was to begin in July 1944 from Romanian territory. The collapse of Romania prevented this, and the installation was destroyed during the German retreat.

- Traffic analysis

The operation of the intercept receivers was directed by the traffic analysis section. Close cooperation was necessary between the intercept operator and the traffic analyst. The assistance of the operators in reconstructing and diagramming Allied networks was very successful. Such work encouraged the operators to take an active interest and it also helped the analysts. The tasks of the traffic analysis section were:
- To record the radio characteristics of the individual Russian air armies.
- The identification of radio networks.
- The identification of call signs, radio beacons and the reconstruction of call sign lists.

- Cryptanalysis

Cryptanalysis was centralised, and was performed at the battalion HQ, except in the case of the signals companies of the Fliegerkorps and special independent signal detachments, which had a small cryptanalyst section of their own. This section at battalion headquarters comprised 50 to 60 people. All codes with the exception of 5-figure codes could be deciphered, if sufficient depth of traffic was available. A great number of codes were used on the southern sector of the Eastern Front and were mostly based on a code, reciphered with a simple substitution cypher. During the campaign, the difficulties in solving these codes were aggravated by the use of variants, unstereotyped messages, and various types of recypherment.

Regarding cryptanalysis of Soviet cyphers in the southern sector, radio traffic took as a whole, the influence of the Russian signal officers was keenly felt. Well, disciplined radio operators, complicated codes and cleverly conceived procedure signals characterised a good signal officer, as was demonstrated by the 5th Air Army and 17th Air Army. Complicated codes made it difficult even for the Soviets, resulting in frequent requests for servicing of messages, involving repetitions and recyphering of the same message in different systems. All this facilitate cryptanalytic work. In the southern sector, old codes were sometimes reintroduced with a new recipherment system. It was not possible to recognise such codes immediately. Only by breaking the recipherment and reconstructing the code was the old code visible. Machine cyphers occasionally appeared on the southern sector, but owing to the small depth of traffic, were not analysed.

- Prisoner-of-war interrogation and captured documents

Testimony of prisoners were not used as a basis, but only as a confirmation of signal reports. A NCO liaison officer worked with the PW interrogation section of Luftflotte 4 to screen all material of value to signals intelligence. Prisoners of special interest, specifically radio operators were sent directly to the battalion headquarters by Luftwaffe intelligence. Captured crews were interrogated in some cases by personnel of the RT outstations, in order to obtain the promptest possible information on signal frequencies and call signs. Captured aircraft were of particular interest to the signals intelligence. Standing orders of the Luftflotte headquarters required all units to examine captured Allied aircraft for Signal Operation Instructions, and to forward them to the nearest signals outstation. Notebooks on crew members often contained important signal and code data which were not supposed to be on the flight. The aircraft transceiver was especially interesting as they often contained a list of frequencies on their face plate.

- Final evaluation

All material was analysed in this section and information of tactical importance was passed to High Command as flash reports. Daily and fortnightly reports, that were strategic as opposed to tactical were also prepared. The following were the duties of the final evaluation in detail:

- Evaluation of plain text and solved messages.
- Grid-square identifications.
- Evaluation of collateral intelligence.
- Maintenance of the situation map and extensive files.
- Daily and fortnightly reports.

- Signal communication

The establishment of communications on the southern sector was a difficult problem as the Russian wired systems were considered inadequate. Standby radio links were maintained by the battalion to its companies and outstations. A signal command network via teleprinter linked the battalion with Referat D and the signals battalions to the other two sectors. The battalion was also a subscriber to the command network of Luftflotte 4 and was authorised to send messages with a high operational priority. Later in the war, a point-to-point network was created that linked the battalion with the network of Luftflotte 4. Cryptographic security settings called Heinrich were used with the Enigma machine cypher.

The following was the minimum that the battalion needed for satisfactory communications:

- A teleprinter line to Referat D
- A teleprinter line to Luftflotte 4
- Two teleprinter lines to Luftwaffe exchange.

One telephone line was required to the Luftflotte and two trunk lines to the nearest Luftwaffe exchange. Conference calls with outstations could be arranged for quick communications of DF and evaluation results. Telephone or voice frequency links called Radio relays (German: Richtverbindung) were used in the Caucasus and at Münzkirchen before the wired network was completed.

Construction of wire communications was very difficult. When the battalion was located at Debrecen and at Vienna near the end of the war, land line communications were severely damaged by Allied air attacks.

=== Technical operations in the east ===
==== Introduction ====
Within the Luftwaffe Chi-Stelle, the principles and procedures underlying traffic evaluation did not differ materially as between the West, South and East. There was no difference in operational principles between West, South and East Luftwaffe signals agencies.

==== Personnel ====
The following types of specialist personnel were employed by the signal battalions on the Eastern front.

- Final evaluators. These specialists worked for short periods in the operations office of the Luftflotten, where they were able to gain an appreciation of signals intelligence in relation to other forms of intelligence, as well as to complement their knowledge of the Allied situation in general.
- Specialists. These were personnel of various Soviet Army theatres, e.g. 1st White Russian Front, 3rd Ukrainian Front.
- Language translators.
- Liaison officers. These were specialists from the Chi-Stelle and the Weather Service.
- Specialists on form messages. These specialists dealt with stereotyped messages containing warning reports, the status of equipment, airfield serviceability.
- Card Index clerks
- Typists and Clerks
- Draftsmen

==== Records ====
Statistical material contained in a card index file was a critical aid to evaluation. This file contained all the information known of Soviet forces and included the number of their units, and their organisation, their record in the war to date, the location of airfields and other salient details, and names of important personalities. Naturally, these records were guarded very carefully and safely stored during bombing or other perilous situations.

- Air Force index

This was the most important file of the evaluation section. It listed all known units of the Soviet air forces, with a separate card for each unit. All data, such as assignment, strength, equipment, movements were entered with date, and reference to the traffic from which the information was obtained. Information not originating with the Chi-Stelle, e.g. Prisoner of war, interrogations, agents' reports, was entered in a distinctive colour.

- Name index

This file contained all names appearing in connection with the various Soviet air force units. The Soviet habit of signing all radio messages with the name of the commanding officer, and the frequent use of the names of pilots and ground officers resulted in a voluminous card index. It was the most important means of identifications of call signs and units. It did not matter how often call-signs were changed, as the use of individual names in messages was always present, units could easily be identified. The Soviets recognised the danger of this procedure comparatively late when cover-names and unit numbers were finally adopted. However, this rule was not fully compromised, so valuable sources on information still remained.

- Airfield index

This file contained a list of all Soviet airfields known, with a description of size, length of the runway, number of revetments, and strength of flak units. After an airfield had been covered by photo reconnaissance, a target number. Assigned by the Luftflotte, it was entered on its card.

==== Analysis and evaluation of special traffic ====
===== Soviet grid systems =====
All messages in which names of localities were given in grid reference were handled by a grid specialist.

Soviet grid references were usually expressed by a 6-figure group with a letter frequently added. The reference was often used to inform Soviet air units of the bomb line. Since the operational sectors of the individual Soviet units were known, and since the Soviet and German front lines were both the same, an entry into the grid system was easily accomplished. The breaking of the map code was further facilitated by the fact that the Soviets in order to specify a location exactly, often put the first, or the first and last name at the end of the figure group e.g. Mykolaiv 412312N, Tarnov 52394Tv. Another point of entry into breaking these grid references was that in the case of a string of encoded locations a reference to terrain elevation was usually left unencoded.

The two most prevalent grid systems were:

- Enciphered longitudinal and latitudinal references, used in connection with small-scale maps and valid for the entire Eastern Front.
- The Gauss–Krüger coordinate system in connection with large-scale maps, used only on certain sectors of the front.

The first system was used by the Soviet Air Raid Warning Service, and by the long-range bombers, while the second was used by the tactical aviation units, and had many variations.

Soviet Grid System during World War II

The following is an example of the Air Raid Warning System; the entire map was divided into large, small and smaller squares. A large square consisting of 1 degree of longitude and 0.5 degrees of latitude. Longitude and latitude references were expressed in a code, which usually changed monthly. A large square was divided into nine small squares, while they, in turn, were subdivided into four smallest squares. A single digit was used to designate the small and smallest squares. These numbers for the squares remained constant and ran clockwise, beginning in the upper left-hand corner. Longitude and latitude references of the large square expressed by the coordinated of its upper and left- hand corner. Thus as shown in [Figure no 1], the encoded references for the city of Poltava would be 465262.

The Gauss-Krüger system was a design for a much smaller grid, the primary difference being that the dimensions of the largest squares were selected arbitrarily by the individual units using the system. From the Chi-Stelle standpoint, the size of these squares could be determined only through experience. The system of numbering the small and smallest squares was the same.

The method of encoding the coordinates used to designate a large square varied with each Soviet air army, and often with units within the air army. Further difficulties for the agency were exposed by the fact that the coded equivalents for longitude and latitude did not always run regularly from west to east and north to south, but occasionally in the opposite order; also some units might choose to use all even numbers, while other units chose odd numbers.

In some systems the large squares were not encoded by number, but with a code name, e.g. lipa for Linden tree, and the encoded reference would not read as 425391 but lipa 91.

In another grid system, longitude was expressed by a double 2-digit number and latitude by three. The next reference referred to the smallest square, the small square being omitted, thus, this system still resulted in a 6-digit reference. This grid was used only in conjunction with large-scale maps.

===== Prearranged form messages =====
Soviet pre-arranged form messages were handled by an individual specialist belonging to the evaluation company. Some messages had the characteristics, in which they differed from other types of traffic:

- They contained in the clear, the words pervoe (firstly), vtoroe (secondly), tretie (thirdly), and so on in numerical ascendancy, indicating the type of report being rendered.
- They contained numbers in consecutive order, which indicated the subject of which was rendered.
- These were followed by groups of irregular numbers, which indicated the strength of personnel, weight or quantity of equipment.

The following is an example of a typical prearranged form message.

Pre-arranged Form Messages
Message	pervoe	03		835	
Meaning	On hand	High octane fuel		835	Kilos
Message	04	1620	05	000	
Meaning	Motor fuel	1620 Kilos	Oil	0	Kilos
Message	06	11350	07	4800	
Meaning	M/G ammo	11350 rounds	A/C ammo	4800	Rounds
Message	vtoroe	03		1560	
Meaning	Required	High octane fuel		1560	Kilos
Message	04	730	05	200	
Meaning	Motor fuel	730 Kilos	Oil	200	Kilos
Message	06	11500	07	2300	
Meaning	M/G ammo	11500 rounds	A/C ammo	23000	Rounds

Daily reports of this type indicating stocks of rations, ammunition and fuel, the condition of airfields, changes in personnel strength, were made by subordinate units to the senior HQ's.

Prearranged form messages of combat aviation units contained, for the most part, details as to strength, location, operational status of aircraft and crews and seldom gave any information as to operations, duration of flights or losses. Any grid locations mentioned in such messages were encoded. The following is an example of such a message:

Pre-arranged Form Messages for Aviation Combat Units
Message	01	195		02
Meaning	regiment	195		location
Message	524313	03		31
Meaning	Ivanovka	aircraft		31
Message	365	04		25
Meaning	type IL-2	serviceable		25
Message	05	6	07	34
Meaning	unserviceable	6	pilots	34
Message	08	37		
Meaning	aerial gunners	37		

In addition to their valuable contents, these messages were an important aid to the identification of call signs and networks. Even when call signs were changed daily, a Soviet unit was easily identified through this information as to members of aircraft and crews, and quantities of oil, fuel, ammunition, which were given in the clear. Since the form of these messages usually remained constant for seven to fourteen days, it was necessary to refer to a similar message of the previous day in order to recognise the unit, and therewith to re-identify the call sign.

Daily summaries and operations reports of combat aviation units were also reported by pre-arranged form messages. Numbers in these messages were encoded, but in such a simple form, however, that speedy analysis was possible. The digits 0 to 9 were enciphered by 3-digit numbers from a prescribed group of 100 numbers. For example, 812=1, 816=2, 831=3,854=4 and so on. The various types of aircraft were encoded with other 3-digit numbers from another group of 100 numbers. For example, LA=507, IL-2=513, IL-4=514, A-20=515, Liberator=524, JU=532. Designations of types of units, e.g. fighter aircraft, fighter-bomber, were encoded within another one hundred number group. The code numbers were changed frequently, but the order of meanings within each hundred member groups remained constant. It was therefore usually sufficient to identify one meaning only in order to re-establish the whole sequence of meanings within a hundred number group.

This system was also used by Soviet long-range bomber groups in their strength reports, and by the Soviet Air Raid Warning Service. It was valid for the whole of the eastern front, and therefore of the greatest importance to all the Chi-Stelle battalions which competed with each other in an attempt to be the first to break a new addition of this code.

===== Weather messages =====
Encoded weather messages were given directly to the weather liaison officer. These could be easily identified by their indicator, by the random use of the letter X within the text of the message, and by the absence of message numbers and delivery groups. Weather messages, sent in clear text, were quite frequent at the beginning of the war but became rarer later on. These were translated into German before they were forwarded to the liaison officer.

The weather liaison officer deciphered messages by means of a deciphering table which was broadcast every six hours from the office of the Chief of the Luftwaffe Weather Service. Weather messages were of assistance in identifying the geographical origin of other traffic intercepted on the same networks, as the weather intercepts often mentioned meteorological stations together with their locations.
