= German radio intelligence operations during World War II =

The German Radio Intelligence Operation were signals intelligence operations that were undertaken by German Axis forces in Europe during World War II. In keeping with German signals practice since 1942, the term "communication intelligence" (German: Nachrichtenaufklärung) had been used when intercept units were assigned to observe both enemy "radio and wire" communication. When the observation of only enemy "radio" communication was undertaken, the term was "radio intelligence" (Funkaufklärung). The term "intercept service" (Horchdienst) was also used up until 1942.

Towards the end of the war, about 12,000 troopers of the German Army were engaged in German Intercept Station Operations during World War II against increasingly powerful enemies. With the decline of information gained by intelligence through aerial observation, prisoner of war interrogations, and reports from enemy agents, communication intelligence became increasingly important. As a result of communication intelligence, German commanders were better informed about the enemy and enemy intentions than in any previous war.

While this form of electronic warfare was being waged, another aspect also gained steadily in importance, on the high-frequency battlefield of Radar in World War II. Radar used Microwave transmission for the location and recognition of enemy units in the air and on the sea, and each side adopted defensive measures, especially in air and submarine warfare.

The third aspect of this electronic warfare, was the radio broadcasters' war, in which propaganda experts endeavored to influence by providing propaganda against the enemy, through foreign language broadcasts over increasingly powerful transmitters. These three aspects of the radio war continued as a "cold war of the airwaves", even when the guns were silent.

== Radio intelligence operations ==
In addition to the intelligence gained from interception of routine radio traffic in peacetime and the activity intercepted during maneuvers, the political and military events which preceded World War II offered abundant material for interception. The reason for this was the increased traffic between nation-states and the larger number of messages, transmitted by communications equipment in an evolving field. During this period, the German signals intelligence organizations and the specialists employed therein gathered an enormous amount of information. The activities of the Reichswehr intercept service from 1933 to 1939 centered around the various international crises that arose.

== Intercept operations during interwar period ==
=== Austrian Revolt of 1934 ===
In 1934, at the time of the Austrian revolt, Munich was given the task of monitoring all Austrian communications traffic including internal communications. In its earliest stage, the monitoring and capture of intercepts were intended only to thoroughly acquaint the Reichswehr cipher bureau personnel with Austrian traffic. However, after the revolt began, warrants for the arrest of political offenders appeared in the customs and police traffic, thus giving the Nazi Party information concerning the fate of its partisans across the border. At the same time, the intercept service monitored Italian communications. Its discovery that the Italians were massing a multitude of divisions at the Brenner Pass brought about the timely withdrawal of Germany from the affair.

=== Occupation of the Rhineland 1935 ===
Ever since 1930, the Munich and Stuttgart intercept stations had, during the summer months at the time of the occupation of the Rhineland, reconnoitered the Demilitarized Zone for suitable intercept sites for use against France. After sites had been selected, the construction work was completed with the help of trustworthy civilians. Several weeks before the Remilitarization of the Rhineland, intensive monitoring of France was ordered. As a result of the intelligence, German troops marched in without fear of reprisal.

=== The Abyssinian War 1933–1936 ===
From 1933 to 1935, during the period of the Abyssinian War, intercept stations of the Army High Command, monitored Italian traffic without cessation. During the Abyssinian War, the intercept stations and the Wehrmacht cipher bureau were able to follow all Italian traffic very closely because, with one exception, it was in possession of all Italian codes. The strength, organization, and locations of the Italian peacetime army were accurately known, and it was possible to keep abreast of the movements of each unit. The SIS also possessed a roster of all Italian officers, from Commander-in-Chief, Benito Mussolini, down to the youngest second lieutenant. Locations, strength, and armament of the Italian Colonial Troops were also known in detail.

=== The Spanish Civil War 1936–1939 ===
General map of the Spanish Civil War (1936–39): Initial Nationalist zone – Jul 1936 Nationalist advance to Sep 1936 Nationalist advance to Oct 1937 Nationalist advance to Nov 1938 Nationalist advance to Feb 1939 Last area under Republican control Main Nationalist centres Main Republican centres / Land battles Naval battles Bombed cities Concentration camps Massacres; Refugee camps

From 1936 to 1939, the Munich and Stuttgart intercept stations monitored both factions during the Spanish Civil War. To facilitate this task, an advanced intercept station was created on the Wendelstein in Bavaria. From the traffic intercepted, it was realized that intercept sites in Spain itself were indispensable. Accordingly, when the Condor Legion was founded, a signals intelligence company was added to it, with personnel count eventually reaching approximately 230 men. With the company, Signals Intelligence took to the field for the first time. However, a mistake was made in placing the unit in the hands of officers who were opposed to the very existence of the signals intelligence apparatus, and who had an unfavorable effect on the work. In spite of this, the unit quickly assumed its role as the most important instrument of intelligence to the Legion Command, the more so because the signal procedures of the Communists were considered very primitive.

The monitoring of the Spanish Civil War was an opportunity to conduct a "war by proxy" against the Soviet Union, as the Republican Armies communications equipment was of mostly soviet origin and design.

=== Czechoslovakia 1938 ===
For a long time during the interwar period, the entire radio net traffic of Czechoslovakia was considered easy to intercept and evaluate. It was observed by fixed listening posts and intercept companies in Silesia and Bavaria and subsequently also by stations in Austria. Towards the end of May 1938, one of the key radio stations in Prague, attached to the Czechoslovak War Ministry, suddenly transmitted a brief unusual message, which was believed to be an order for mobilization. This message was immediately followed by changes in the radio traffic characterized by the use of new frequencies and call signs, and by regrouping of radio nets which had been prepared for the event of mobilization. During the next few days, very primitive and simple radio nets appeared along the border and then disappeared again when the tension was relaxed, whereupon the entire radio net resumed its original characteristics. The Intercept Control Station was able to report that the mobilization order had been revoked.

==== Czechoslovakia radio efficiency ====
During the middle of 1938, the Czechoslovakia war ministry repeated the same procedure as happened in Spring 1938. Again another announcement for mobilization order was repeated by radio and within a few minutes, the message was forwarded to Berlin. The same primitive radio nets appeared along the border with almost the same call signs on the same radio frequencies.

German signal intelligence considered it a practical object lesson in how to run an inept radio operation. The reason for the two partial mobilizations by Czechoslovakia was considered by the Professor of History, Igor Lukeš, who has studied this event at length, stating that it was a possible deception operation by the Soviet Union, where disinformation was fed to the Czechoslovaks, causing the partial mobilization. The reason was that Joseph Stalin feared not war but a diplomatic arrangement between the western allies and Hitler leading to the collapse of Czechoslovakia. Certainly at that time Hitler had no plans to invade Czechoslovakia, although it seems the mobilization seemed to cause a change of mind.

== Intercept operations during World War II ==
=== Polish Campaign 1939 ===
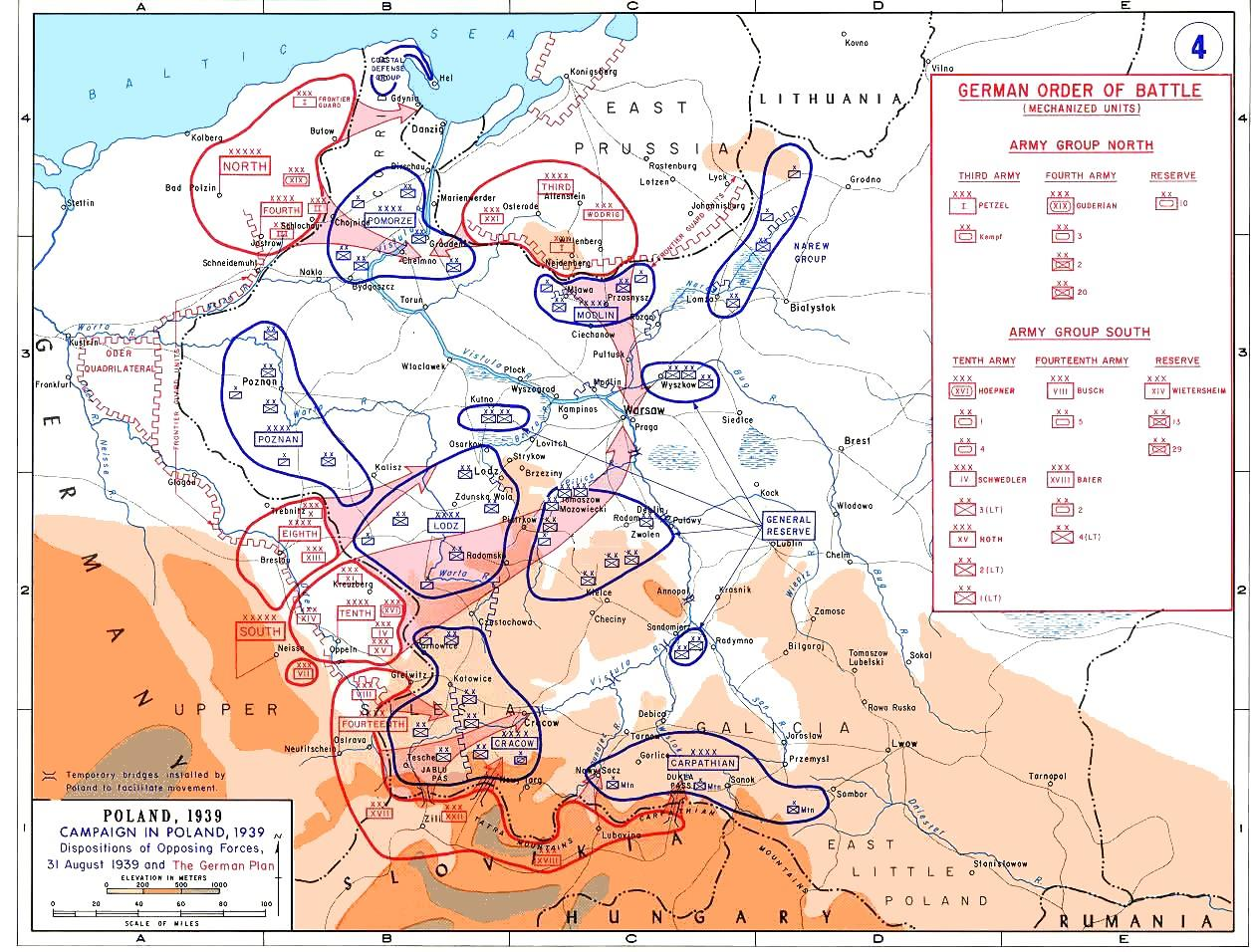
Invasion of Poland

Polish radio communications were well known to the Intercept Control Station, as a result of long observation during the interwar period, and were intercepted from points in Silesia and East Prussia. During the summer of 1939, the intercept service and cipher bureau observed not only the regular traffic but a large number of field messages which increased daily and was far out of proportion to the known organisation and radio equipment possessed by the Polish Army. As was later confirmed after the Invasion of Poland in September 1939, the purpose of this was to camouflage Polish radio communications by using three call signs and three frequencies for each station. Intelligence officers engaged in the evaluation of traffic and D/F data were unable to derive any detailed tactical results from the intercepted messages. It was impossible for officers to determine if Polish efforts to disguise their efforts were to simulate stronger forces than they possessed. In any case, the lack of radio silence in the assembly area was a grave mistake.

In 1939, German intercept was still mostly immobile. Intercept companies were mostly motorized but there was no close cooperation between them and the army group and HQ. The Polish radio communication system failed after the second day of the campaign when it attempted to take the place of the wire landlines destroyed by bombing. Perhaps as a result of the intercept successes they had achieved in the 1920s, they had restricted peacetime radio activity to a minimum. As soon as they ramped up radio communications, their communication nets collapsed completely. The system was unable to keep pace with the Polish retreat, and they were seized by a kind of panic. Clear-text messages revealed that some stations would not transmit, lest they be bombed. The lack of information meant that the leading source of information regarding the situation became the German OKW communique (German: Wehrmachtbericht). This mistake was corrected by the OKW in 1940.

A Commander of Intercept Troops East (German: Kommandeur der Horchtruppern Ost) was left in occupied Poland to continue monitoring the Soviet Union from the intercept posts in Königsberg/Cranz and Striegau with the 3rd/7 and 3rd/18 intercept companies.

=== Soviet Union 1939–1940 ===
After the conclusion of the Polish Campaign, the intercept company FAK 610 (KONA 6), stationed in Galacia region, in the Sanok-Jaroslav-Sandomir area was charged with intercepting radio traffic from the officially friendly Soviet Union units, in eastern Poland, while the Soviet Union was undertaking the invasion of Poland.

Using their previous experience had provided the personnel of the unit with excellent training that enabled them to become rapidly skilled in this new type of work. The intercept company was not engaged in cryptanalysis but solely on the basis of D/F reports and evaluation of traffic intercepts handled by the numerous stations, the staff were able to deduce that a large number of units were in the area but had no way to determine their organisational structure or Order of Battle. All that could be determined was whether the units belonged to the army, air force, or the NKVD, whose radio intercepts were distinguished by a different call sign, than that used by the regular armed forces. For several months during the period of regrouping, everything was in a state of flux. The Soviet radio traffic was considered well organised and efficiently handled. Then the company intercepted messages from areas that were not actually assigned to it. When the USSR occupied the Baltic states of occupied Estonia, Latvia and Lithuania (Occupation of the Baltic states) and when they subsequently attacked Finland, their Shortwave radio transmissions from those areas were very well received by FAK 610 in southern Galicia, even better in areas further north. This was considered a discovery of great technical importance for the German intercept service. It could not have been arrived at by simple calculation, since it resulted from physical conditions.

A large number of messages were received from the Baltic states and the Finnish theatre of war, so that in the final stages of evaluation it was possible to determine the Soviet Order of Battle. At division size, withdrawal was ascertained on the basis of data including numbers, names of officers and place names. Subsequently, the same units, now identifiable, turned up on the Finnish front at easily identified locations and were able to be tracked at other locations, e.g. Eastern Poland. Some units vanished, which indicated they had transferred to the interior of Soviet Russia.

The radio communication of the Soviet Army in 1939–1940 was efficient and secure under peacetime conditions, but during wartime, it offered weak spots to enemy intercept services and was a source of excellent information for the German intelligence service.

=== German Campaign in the Balkans ===
Chart 1. Radio Intercept Operations of German Communication Intelligence Units against the Balkans and Near East 1941 during the Battle of Greece

The German Army organisation for mobile warfare was still incomplete; results were jeopardized at first by the great distances between intercept stations and the target areas, and later by defective signal communication which delayed the work of evaluation.

The Commander of Intercept Troops Southeast, whose HQ was a regiment (See Chart 1) located to the east of Bucharest in Romania, was responsible to Field marshal Wilhelm List, the 12th Army commander. He was responsible for two fixed intercept stations in Graz and Tulln an der Donau and two intercept companies. His sphere of action comprised the entire Balkan Peninsula, Turkey and the British forces in Greece and the Middle East.

Italian invasion and initial Greek counter-offensive 28 October – 18 November 1940.

Greek counter-offensive and stalemate 14 November 1940 – 23 April 1941.

Until late in 1940, radio interception against Greece and the Near East was carried out only as a secondary task with insufficient resources by the Tulln station. The great distances, for instance, some 780 miles between Vienna and Athens and the 1440 miles between Vienna and Jerusalem, were a significant factor, whereas, for comparison, radio intercept operations between Münster and London is only 312 miles. The value of the results was in inverse proportion to the distances involved.

In the beginning of 1941, when it was planned to enlarge the intercept service against Greece especially after the landing of British Forces, units described above, except for the Graz station, were transferred to Romania. In February 1941, Major Fritz Boetzel, the Commander of Intercept Troops, Southeast and his evaluation centre were stationed in Bucharest. From a location near this city, the Tulln station covered Greece, given its main communication requirements to intercepting British communications emanating from there and the Middle East. One of the intercept companies also located in the vicinity of Bucharest observed Yugoslavia in addition to British radio traffic in Greece. The other intercept company, located in Bacău, (150 miles north of Bucharest) has to carry out intercept operations against Soviet Russia and the Romanian police, whereas the Graz station, whose main attention was directed at Yugoslavia and Italy, intercepted traffic of the Romanian and Hungarian police.

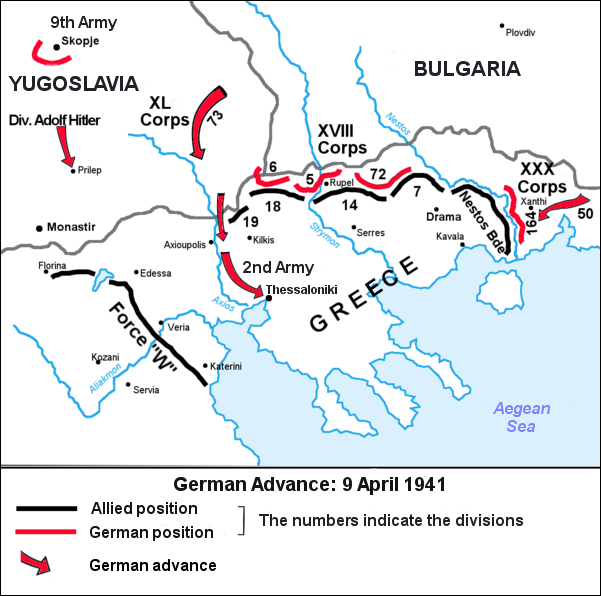
German advance until 9 April 1941, when the 2nd Panzer Division seized Thessaloniki

Before the outbreak of hostilities in the Balkans, the Germans detected Greek army units in the northeastern corner of the country, Royal Air Force operations around Patras and Athens, and British ground forces in Cyrenaica. The also intercepted messages from the British border troops in the Emirate of Transjordan.

After the entry of German troops into Bulgaria, the above units, except the Graz station, were transferred to that country and the intercept company in Bacau also covered Greece. The results were similar to those formerly obtained. It was not yet possible however, to break Greek ciphers, because of an insufficient number of intercepted messages, so the German units had to be content with traffic analysis. It was possible to break the British field cipher in Palestine though.

==== Attack on Greece ====
Following the attack upon Greece on 6 April 1941, brisk radio traffic was intercepted and evaluated. The disposition of Greek forces in northern Greece was revealed and could be traced. West of the River Vardar in the British Expeditionary Force sector, the German intercept units detected three radio nets comprising 14 stations, representing an armoured unit northeast of Veria, which was subsequently transferred to the area south of Vevi, a British division north of Katerini and another division west of Demetrios. It was confirmed that these forces has remained for several days in the areas reported. On 8 April 1941, the following British message in clear text was repeatedly read:

DEV reporting from LIJA --- Strumica fallen, prepare immediate return!

In the Near East, the intercept units followed the movement of a British regiment from Palestine to Egypt. The first indication of this was a message of a Paymaster in the British military government ordering a certain agency to be particularly careful to prevent the departing regiment from taking any filing cabinets along with them, since these were needed by the military government office. Thereafter, the regiments movements could be clearly traced.

Radio intelligence against Yugoslavia produced an excellent picture of enemy positions. Three Armeegruppe (temporary groupings of army-sized units, where the command of one of its composite units formed the grouping's command structure) and one corps from each were located near Niš, Skopje and Štip and later at Veles.

Very little radio traffic was heard in Turkey. By the middle of April 1941, German radio intelligence located Greek troop units between the River Haliacmon and the Albanian border, and also followed the withdrawal of a British armoured unit from the vicinity of Vevi to the Kozani area, and subsequently to Eleftochorion and subsequent to Trikala. The withdrawal of British divisions and a few days later, further withdrawals to the area of Larissa were observed.

In the middle of April, the Commander of Intercept Troops Southeast moved to the Salonika area with the Tulln station, elements of the Graz station and one intercept company. The other intercept company was released for service in Russia.

Greek radio traffic diminished rapidly and ended on 21 April 1941. German intercept units continued to follow the traffic of the British Expeditionary Force in Greece until it disappeared from the air after the final embarkation in late April 1941. The intercepting of British traffic from Crete and the Aegean Islands was continued. During subsequent British operations in the Dodecanese Islands, for instance the occupation of Rhodes, the enemy often transmitted important situation reports in the clear.

=== Norway and Denmark 1940 ===
Chart 2. German radio intelligence operations during Norwegian Campaign 31 March 1940 – 14 June 1941

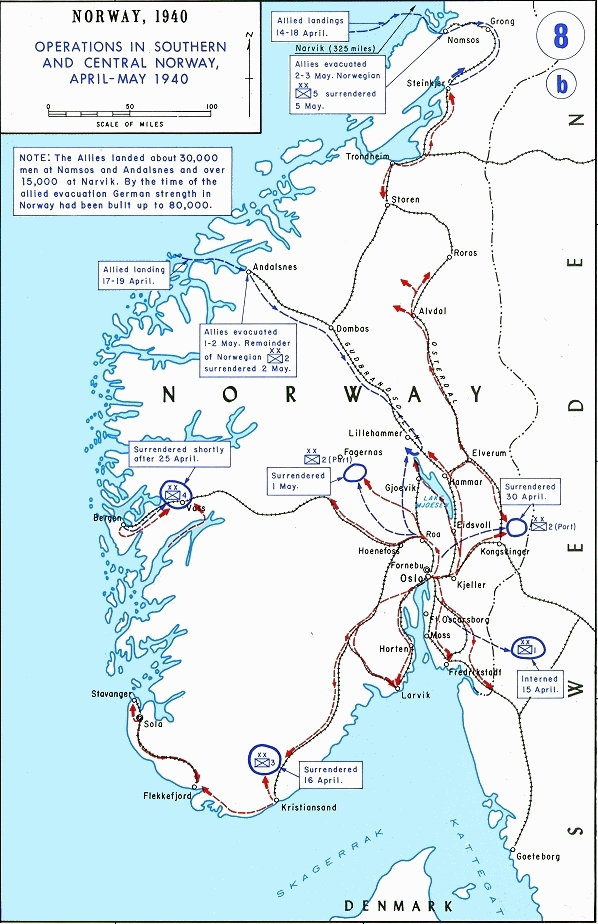
Military land operations in southern and central Norway in April and May 1940

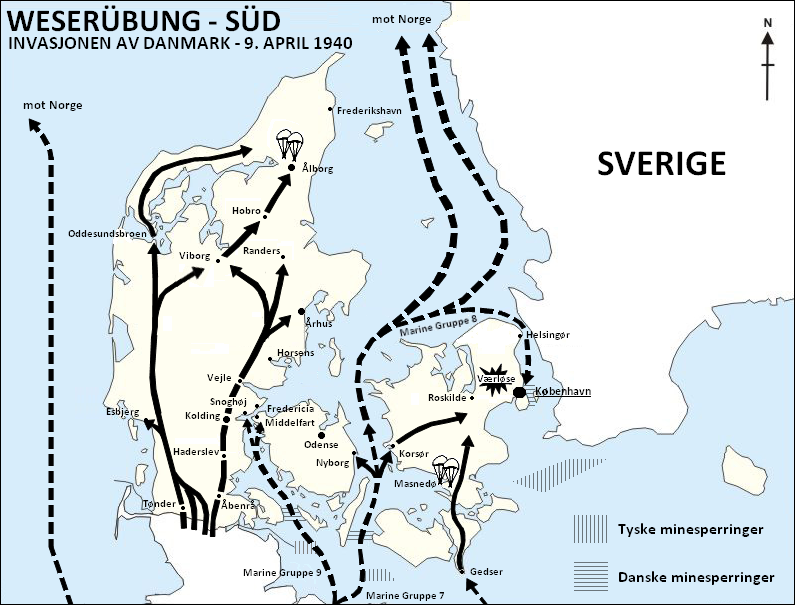
German invasion plans for Denmark

The mobile operation of an intercept platoon in the Norwegian Campaign in 1940 suffered from all the defects inherent in inadequately prepared improvised operations. A few radio operators were picked from each of six different units in the West, but no translators or cryptanalysts. The equipment was also inadequate. Later, there was no shipping space to move the platoon up in time and close enough to the German operations staff and the enemy area which was to be covered, nor was the platoon given any data or instructions.

==== Husum fixed station ====
In its first operation, which was carried out with the assistance of the Husum fixed intercept stations, the platoon intercepted only coastal defense messages in Plaintext from Denmark concerning ship movements. No army radio traffic was heard. Even these messages ceased on 9 April 1940. Because of the great distance only a few Norwegian coastal stations were heard. Up to 8 April, this traffic was normal, but on the night of 8–9 April, it increased to a point of wild confusion. Normal army radio traffic was observed in Sweden. After the platoon's first move, to Als on the Kattegat, Norwegian Army messages were also intercepted, as well as traffic between Swedish and Norwegian radio stations. It was not until 24 April, i.e. 11 days after the operations had commenced, that the intercept platoon was moved up to Oslo and thus employed in the vicinity of the German operations staff. (See Chart 2). This has the layout of the intercept companies.

The Norwegian Army stations usually transmitted in Plaintext. Radio station traffic in central and southern Norway was intercepted, but few of the messages were of any tactical value.

Radio messages between Great Britain and Norway were more important. The Admiralty station transmitted encrypted orders to the naval officers in the command of the strategic towns of Harstadt, Åndalsnes and Ålesund. Although these messages could not be solved, they provided clues to the most important debarkation ports of the British Expeditionary Force. In particular, they confirmed the landings near Harsdadt, which had hitherto been merely a matter of conjecture.

Germany intercepted the field messages of the British units which were advancing from the Åndalsnes area by way of Dombås, Otta, Hamar to Lillehammer in the direction of Oslo. They used code names for all their call signs and signatures. The messages themselves could not be solved. However, since their code names were learned after a short time from captured documents, the Chain of Command was learned enabling Germany to clearly recognise the composition of units.

Swedish radio stations were frequently heard transmitting to Norwegian stations, and handled mostly official and business messages. Norwegian radio messages were then relayed from Sweden to Great Britain.

When in the middle of May, a unit of German command staff was transferred to the city of Trondheim, with an intercept platoon, and found especially favourable receiving conditions near the city, which was approximately 1500 feet above sea level. A large Norwegian radio net regularly transmitted air reconnaissance reports, information on the composition and commitment to mobilization of the Norwegian 7th Division, a second field Brigade that was formed by General Carl Gustav Fleischer to fight in northern Norway against the invading Germans.

Two radio stations continued to operate east of the island of Vega in the rear of the German 2nd Mountain Division, which was advancing to relieve Narvik, until they were knocked out as the results of intercepts. The majority of the radio stations which were observed were in the Narvik area, or to the north of the city. The Alta Battalion was often mentioned as being in action. Additional stations of other radio nets were identified in Kirkenes, Vardø, Harstad, Tromsø, Alta and Honningsvåg. At the end of hostilities on 9 June, all Norwegian traffic stopped within a few hours. Messages from British and French units were also picked up, as well as traffic from the Polish mountain units. For the purpose of avoiding confusion with internal French traffic, a temporary teletype line to the commander of the German intercept troops in France was created, so that any radio transmissions from France would be recognised and tuned out.

In order to furnish the Kampfgruppe Dietl in Narvik with radio intelligence of a type specific for local importance without loss of time, the intercept platoon was ordered to organise a short-range intelligence section, but as a result of the development of the situation, this section never saw actions. Instead, intercepts of interest to Kampfgruppe Dietl were forwarded to it through Sweden by telephone and teletype. During 7 and 8 June all non-Norwegian traffic stopped, which confirmed the withdrawal of the Allies from Narvik.

==== Norway to Great Britain ====
The traffic between Great Britain and Norway, which has already been intercepted near Oslo, was now observed in larger volumes from Trondheim. Most of the traffic was between Scotland (possibly Prestwick) and Bodø or Tromsø. The volume of messages was very large, with the average word count of 200 letters. Britain was using Naval Cypher No 1. since 1934, for their Naval Command messages. This used a 4-digit code book. Britain was also using the Naval Code, a less secure 5-digit book used since 1934, for communications to merchant shipping, i.e. Convoys. With a 5-digit book, the word count would be 40 in a 200 letter message, and 50 words, if the administrative Naval Code was used. Every evening the Germans intercepted situation reports of the Norwegian High Command in Tromsø, orders from the British Admiralty in London, mine warnings, SOS calls, government messages to England and France, personal messages from King Haakon to King George VI and Queen Wilhelmina of the Netherlands, and reports of the Reuters news correspondents attached to Norwegian units.

On 25 May, the radio station at Bodø was destroyed by German bombers. Scotland called Bodø for 12 hours in vain. Messages then transmitted by the Vadsø radio station were immediately intercepted. Germany continued to intercept the traffic between Norway, Sweden and Great Britain.

Both the Trondheim station and the intercept platoon radioed a demand for surrender to the Norwegian High Command in Tromsø. After its acceptance these radio channels were kept in operation until the middle of June 1940, when the platoon was disbanded and its personnel returned to their former units on the Western Front.

==== British radio efficiency ====
British radio traffic was, as usual, well disciplined and offered few opportunities to German radio intelligence intercept. For this reason the intercept platoon endeavoured to work on as broad a scale as large as possible and to intercept a large number of messages, and to probe for soft spots. Since it lacked special equipment and suitable personnel, the British ciphers could not be solved. Therefore, clear-text messages or code names and traffic analysis had to suffice as source material. Traffic evaluation was based therefore, on procedural aspects of enemy radio operations.

Today it appears incomprehensible that Great Britain seriously impaired the value of well-disciplined radio organisation and their excellent ciphers by transmitting call signs and signatures in the clear. Operating mistakes of that kind provided valuable information to the German intercept services, although it was poorly trained and insufficiently prepared. Subsequent experience on other battlefields showed that more extensive and intelligent efforts on the German side would have resulted in even more opportunities for breaking British ciphers.

British-Norwegian radio traffic was typical of the deficiencies which develop during a coalition with a weaker ally. It was carried on according to Norwegian standards and offered a wealth of information to German communication intelligence. The British and Norwegians were apparently unable to use a common cipher. On the other hand, the operating efficiency of British radio communications procedures was high. The Norwegian personnel appeared to have been recruited from the ranks of professional radio operators.

At this point it should be repeated that the use of clear-text messages and code names should be avoided as a matter of principle. If code names were considered indispensable, they should have been frequently changed. A decisive transmission error prominent in traffic between the British Isles and Norway was the use of call signs in the clear as listed in the Bern Table of Call Signs. By this means alone it was possible to recognise and identify these messages after only a few minutes of listening.

==== Conclusions ====
By way of summary, it can be stated that during the Norwegian Campaign, British radio operators did not at all times observe the security measures which would have protected them from interception and evaluation by German intelligence. The results achieved by German radio intelligence during this campaign were quite modest, and understandably so, in view of the shortage of equipment and personnel, which consisted of only one first lieutenant (German: Oberleutnant) and 24 enlisted men.

=== Campaign in the West 1940 ===
Chart 3-a. Operations by German Signal Intercept Units prior to Invasion of France and Low Countries August 1939 to October 1939

Chart 3-c. Operations by German Signal Intercept Units prior to Invasion of France and Low Countries February to April 1940

Chart 3-b. Operations by German Signal Intercept Units prior to Invasion of France and Low Countries October 1939 to January 1940

Chart 3-d. Operations by German Signal Intercept Units prior to Invasion of France and Low Countries after April 1940

Prior to the beginning of the Western Campaign on 10 May 1940, the operations and command channel structure of German radio intelligence was divided into four chronological phases. (See Chart 3, a-d Note: Chart a and b are before and after the campaign)

Up to January 1940, the fixed intercept stations were under direct OKH jurisdiction with regard to long-range intelligence covering France, Belgium, the Netherlands and Great Britain. Following instructions from OKH, Intercept Evaluation Centre #3, operating from Army Group 3 HQ in Frankfurt am Main, which was then responsible for operations in the West, ordered the mobile intercept companies to intercept Belgium and French traffic emanating from the border region. The intercept companies which became available for reassignment at the end of the Polish campaign were sent to the west.

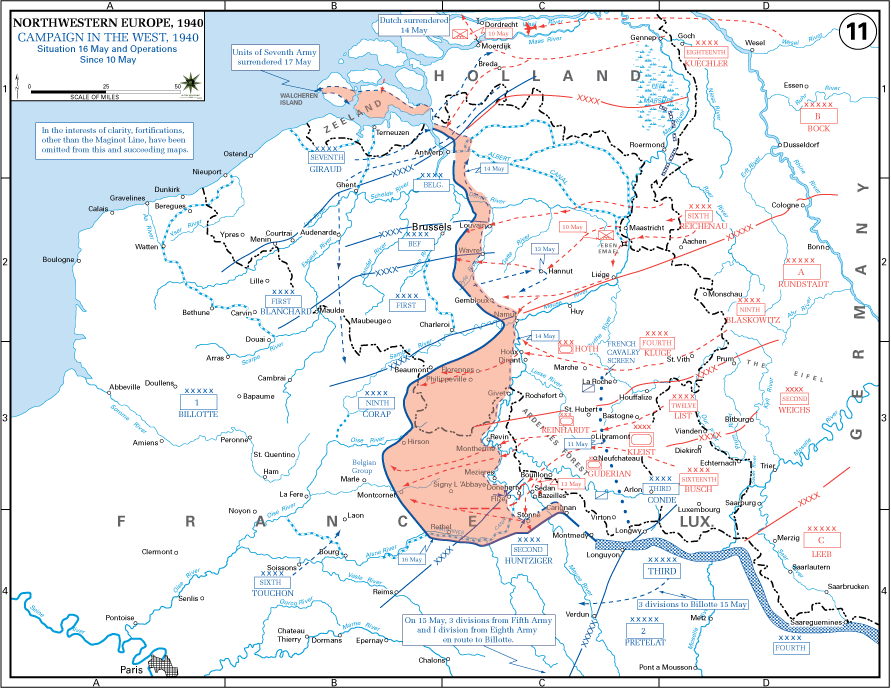
The German advance until noon, 16 May 1940

For operations, the HQ of intercept troops with each army group was assigned one evaluation centre (NAAS) and two intercept companies; the fixed intercept station at Euskirchen had been temporarily motorized as an intercept company. The Münster and Stuttgart fixed intercept stations continued to co-operate with the commanders of intercept troops (the Münster station with Army Group B, and the Stuttgart station with Army Group C). It was intended to move them forward as soon as possible.

Prior to the start of major operation the information obtained by radio intelligence from the northern sector held by the British and French forces was not particularly valuable because of the great distance involved, for instance 210 miles between Lille and Münster, and because of its largely technical character. Thus, all intercept units were thoroughly familiar with the French systems as a result of the many messages which had been copied. The intercept units of Army Group B were also familiar with the Belgium, Dutch and British systems. As early as December 1939, Germany decoded a special cryptographic system used by French command in radio messages to the armies and military district headquarters. It had been used, contrary to regulations, prior to the start of the war in September 1939. Germany was able to solve this system due to the radio station guilty of the violation, which was later reprimanded and thereupon repeated the same messages in the proper system. Their contents revealed a certain amount of organisational information, for example, the fact that the French 2nd Light Cavalry Division and 3rd Cavalry Division had been reorganised into the 1st Armoured Division and 2nd Armoured Division and were due to move into their assembly area northeast of Paris by 1 January 1940. However, this type of incomplete information could generally be considered only as a supplement to and confirmation of other intelligence concerning the Allies. It was not possible to deduce the Allies order of battle from radio intelligence alone.

==== Invasion of France ====
Nevertheless, Germany could identify the probable concentration areas of the French and British armies from the practice messages sent by army field radio stations, although the boundaries of army groups, armies, corps and divisions could not be established with any certainty. Greater clarity prevailed about the fortified area behind the Maginot Line in the south. Allies forces stationed near the Franco-Swiss and Franco-Italian borders were not observed according to any regular plan. Spot-check intercepting failed to pick up the French Tenth Army in the location where it was presumed to be by the German command. However, radio intelligence did indicate the presence of the French Sixth Army.

==== British Expeditionary Force ====
Intercepted radio messages from the British Expeditionary Force enabled Germany to conclude that the following units had been transferred to the Continent:

- One army HQ under the command of General John Gort.
- Three corps HQs.
- Five regular motorized divisions, which were the 1st Infantry Division to 5th Infantry Division.
- One armoured division.

As well as several divisions of the second and third waves, the exact number and numerical designations of which could not be ascertained.

The intercepted Belgian and Dutch messages permitted only one conclusion, namely their preparations were directed against Germany exclusively. Belgian traffic was characterized by good radio discipline, whereas the Dutch were more careless.

The missions which OKH gave to the army group HQ concerning radio intelligence were merely supplemented by the latter. Army Group B and Army Group A were requested to give priority to intelligence pertaining to the British Army as well as the French 1st and 7th Armies. Special value was attached to ascertaining at an early date whether the French Seventh Army would immediately march into Belgium.

At first the fixed intercept stations were ordered to cover the more remote areas beyond the French border. The Oberkommando des Heeres was guided by the idea of retaining most of the long-range intelligence in its own hands, and of having the intercept companies concentrate more on short range intelligence. To be sure, this intention was not clearly expressed in the orders. It also soon became evident that the two fixed intercept stations did not suffice for long range intelligence.

During the first few weeks the main efforts of radio intelligence were concentrated on the area facing Army Group B.

==== Leaking Allied radio ====
Immediately after the opening of hostilities, Dutch and Belgian radio traffic increased suddenly in this area. From plain text messages sent by the III Corps Netherlands close to 's-Hertogenbosch, which were supplemented by plain text radio reports from the Dutch II Corps consisting of the Dutch 2nd Infantry Division and Dutch 4th Infantry Division near Rhenen at the Grebbe line, Germany learned on 11 May that the Allies had decided to withdraw into Fortress Holland (Battle of the Netherlands). Germany also learned from intercepted traffic from Belgium, which was supplemented by plain-text messages from the Belgian 6th Infantry Division that was part of the Belgian II Corps near Beringen that the Belgians intended to offer strong resistance behind the Albert Canal.

On 10 and 11 May, French radio traffic in the Poperinge-Ypres-Kortrijk area. and the British traffic in the Ghent, enabled Germany to realize that elements of the French Seventh Army and apparently also elements of the British Army had advanced into Belgian territory. Moreover, the Germans were able to deduce from the characteristics that the British 1st Armoured Division had moved from Brussels to Leuven. As early as 12 May, a message from the HQ station of the French 7th Army was solved which indicated that the latter intended to defend the River Dyle positions. Direction finding revealed the landing of French units on the former island of Walcheren.

==== Netherlands radio ceased ====
As the result of the surrender of the Dutch Army, the interception of Dutch radio traffic would be discontinued on 15 May.

During the battle for the Dyle positions, the Germans picked up the command nets of the French First and Seventh Armies, whose HQs were plotted on Ypres and Valenciennes on 17 May, although from the radio messages transmitted within these nets to the subordinate corps and divisions, it was possible to determine only the total number and not the designations of these units. Only on a few occasions could such designations be picked up from messages carelessly radioed in the clear, e.g. when the French 54th and 72nd Divisions were detected on 19 May as belonging to the same corps in the Ghent-Bruges area.

It was equally impossible to ascertain the divisional designations within the British Army, the headquarters of which was found to be in Hazebrouck on 23 May. However, by the end of May, the presence of twelve divisions had been traced, which included in addition to the regular divisions, the 1st London Division, 12th, 23rd, 45th, 50th and 51st Divisions.

==== Belgian radio ceased ====
No more Belgian command radio traffic was observed after 19 May, when the Franco-British forces in the north under General Gaston Billotte were threatened by a double envelopment in the Valenciennes-Cambrai-Maubeuge-Mons area. After 22 May, Germany was able to plot the withdrawal of French and Belgian units from the Ghent Canal and Scheldt River westward from the Bruges-Ghent-Tournai.

On that day, the British Army HQ established direct contact with the Ministry of War in London, and the French army group commander exchanged a remarkably large number of messages with the French High Command in Free France. In spite of intensified efforts, Germany were unable to cryptanalyse the Allies ciphers.

==== Radio in the Calais pocket ====
Unusually long encrypted messages, likewise unbreakable, from the French First Army headquarters to an unidentified senior staff located south of the Somme suggested that joint action for attempting breakouts was being agreed on by radio. Breakout attempts then actually took place near Valenciennes, Arras and Cambrai. Plain-text messages sent on 24 May, in which complaints were voiced about the lack of ammunition, rations and fuel, confirmed that the situation within the pocket was becoming critical. On 25 May, a decrypted message to the British commander at Calais, Claude Nicholson, confirmed the seriousness of the situation. This same message enabled Germany to locate the 5th Infantry Division together with the French 68th Infantry, near Nieuwpoort and it also indicated the beginning of the evacuation of the British Expeditionary Force to England.

On 26 May, intensive direction-finding operations confirmed the concentration of British, French and Belgian forces in the areas including Ghent, Kortrijk, Valenciennes, Lens, Béthune, Saint-Omer and Gravelines. Outside this area, no more enemy traffic was heard.

==== Collapse of Allied radio ====
After 28 May, approximately the time of the Belgian capitulation, it was no longer possible to distinguish the various radio nets and to observe and evaluate them systematically. Continued direction-finding operations indicated that the encirclement area has been split up into three pockets: a northern one, east of Dunkirk, from which mostly British traffic was heard; a central pocket, northwest of Roubaix; and a southern pocket, southeast of Lille. Because of the concentration of a great number of transmitters within one narrow area, it was no longer possible to take accurate bearings. The intermingling of different units was reflected by the confusion which was beginning to spread among the radio operators, who no longer felt bound by any rules, all of which resulted in a situation which in German radio terminology is described as a "call sign and wave-length stew".

==== Conclusions ====
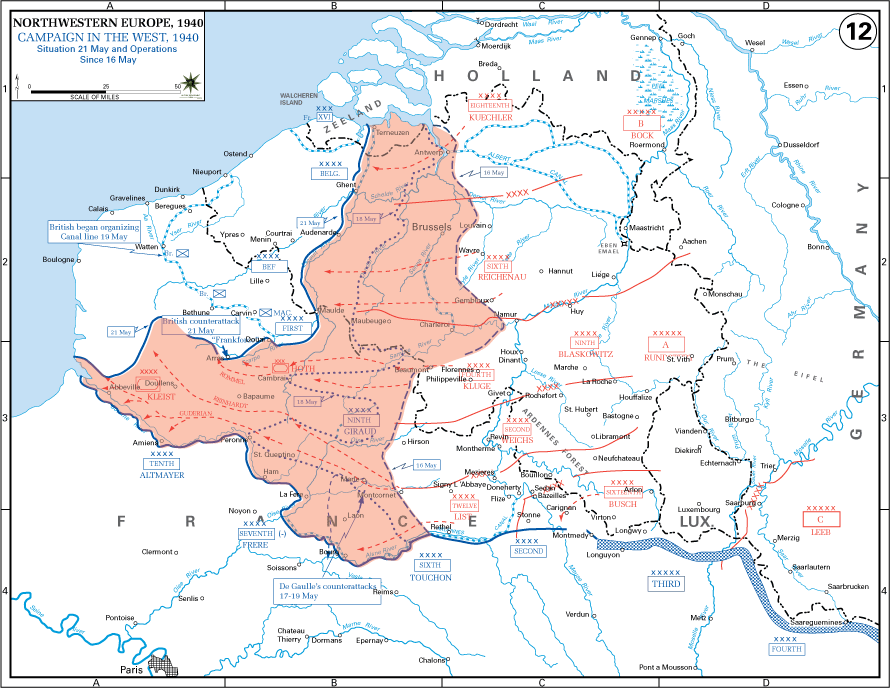
The German advance up to 21 May 1940

An evaluation of the radio traffic during the first phase of the campaign in the west, with the exception of Dutch traffic, which practically disappeared after five days of fighting, led to the following conclusions:

- The different operating techniques made it easy to distinguish rapidly between French, British and Belgian units.
- Generally speaking, the Allies transmitted too many messages and thus enabled Germany to intercept them without any trouble. However, except for serious violations of radio security, such as the sending of messages in the clear, i.e. Plaintext, the General der Nachrichtenaufklärung and other German intelligence agencies were confronted with considerable difficulties, because the majority of the cryptographic systems used by the Allies proved unbreakable.
- In view of the rapid conduct of operations, particularly those of motorized and armoured units, the information obtained by German radio intelligence was of secondary importance in comparison with that gathered by ground and air combat reconnaissance.
- On the evening of the first day of the attack German radio intelligence picked up messages from the area west of Namur facing Army Group A. The characteristics of these messages left no doubt about the presence of at least two French armoured divisions. The fact that this was reported in time, together with reliable information about the disposition of French forces on the western bank of the River Meuse, made it possible to warn the German armoured units which had been moved forward to the Meuse and which after crossing the river on 15 May, were actually engaged in heavy fighting.
- Remarkable radio discipline was observed by the French Ninth Army, which was soon attacked by (German: Panzergruppe) Panzer Group Kleist and by the inner flanks of Army Groups A and Army Groups B between Maubeuge (where 90 per cent of the town centre was destroyed by bombardments in May 1940) Montmédy. The information obtained from the 56th Intercept Company, which was committed along the axis of advance of Panzer Group Kleist, was therefore initially unimportant. Since the 56th could not, in the long run, keep pace with Panzer Group Kleist, while carrying on its direction-finding operations, it was ordered to halt on 20 May near Le Cateau-Cambrésis, where it took bearings from two base lines: from the first, directed westward towards Maubeuge-Péronne-en-Mélantois, searching the area bounded by the Franco-Belgian border on the right and by the Somme as far as the Channel coast on the left, while from the base line directed southward through Arras and Rethel it covered the Somme and Aisne sectors.
- The 3rd Intercept Company was assigned to the Laon-Arlon base line after it has crossed the Franco-Belgian border on 14 May. While France moved up division after division in order to cover the open flank, which had developed along the Aisne and Somme as a result of the advance by Panzer Group Kleist, these two intercept companies gradually succeeded in identifying the enemy groupings to the south.
- As early as 14 May, a new army net with three secondary stations was detected. An army HQ was plotted as being west of Verdun, but on the basis of the first observations it could not be identified as that of the French Second Army. One corps was found east of Reims, close to Grandpré. There was some doubt concerning the significance of the staff detected east of Reims; instead of corps traffic it might also have been the inter-net traffic of the army. In the final evaluation the results were treated cautiously, and it was merely concluded that the French second Army sector has been widened, leaving open the possibility that a new front was being built up between Rethel and Stenay.
- Two days later, on 16 May, a new HQ near Épernay appeared on the air with links to the corps in the Challerange-Grandpré area in the centre of the above-mentioned net. On the basis of a plaintext message this HQ was identified as the new French Sixth Army, commanded by General Robert-Auguste Touchon, who was mentioned by name. This information, at first doubted by the German command, was confirmed by other sources on 20 May. On 22 May, the western flank of the new Sixth Army was plotted south of Amiens. On the same day near Montdidier, a mobile division was identified which had been brought up from the area north of Verdun and had established contact with Sixth Army.
- On 23 May, it was possible to determine the boundary between the French Sixth and French Second Armies at the Canal latéral à l'Aisne north of Vouziers.
- In the meantime, it was possible, solely by intercepting division HQ stations, to count every French division in the newly established Aisne sector and to report all changes, daily. However, only in one instance did Germany succeed in establishing a divisional designation, namely the French 6th Colonial Division, in Machault southwest of Vouziers on 19 May.
- Reinforced by the 26th Intercept Company, which Army Group B was able to release in the north, radio intelligence now began the systematic coverage of the Somme section between the coast and Péronne. Here on 23 May, a new staff was recognized in the "radio picture" near Elbeuf, and another near Clermont. It was not initially possible to identify clearly these two staff HQs. It was not until ten divisions between the coast and the Oise were identified as belonging to Staff Clermont that the commitment of another army was reported.
- In the following days the French Sixth Army at Épernay, the Staff Elbeuf and Army HQ Clermont were in contact with a station near Meux, which, because of its high efficiency and characteristic transmitting technique, was believed to be the station of an army group HQ. It maintained no contact with the Second Army at Verdun, but a fourth command net did appear whose called station could not be located. As reported by the commander of intercept troops attached to Army Group C, the French Fourth Army at Nancy was not heard after 23 May from the fortified areas. Its station was not associated with new traffic which appeared regularly in the Châlons-en-Champagne area but which could not be assigned any definite part in the command radio picture.
- Nevertheless, the picture of the order of battle was well rounded: Army Group Meaux in command of the Sixth Army at Épernay, Armée Clermont, and Armée Elbeuf, had the mission of defending the Somme and Aisne. This mission was confirmed by the radio address given by Paul Reynaud on 28 May.
- Between 1 and 4 June, the information concerning the unit disposition between the English Channel coast and the fortified areas, which had been obtained by radio intelligence, was confirmed from a source and was supplanted by the information that the Armée Elbeuf (which had recently been plotted in La Feuillée) was the French Tenth Army commanded by General Robert Altmayer, which had been brought up from the Italian border; that Armée Clermont (now fixed as being in Creil) was the newly formed French Seventh Army commanded by General Aubert Frère; and the Army Group Meaux was presumably the staff of General Antoine-Marie-Benoît Besson who commanded the French Tenth Army and French Eighth Army on the southern flank.

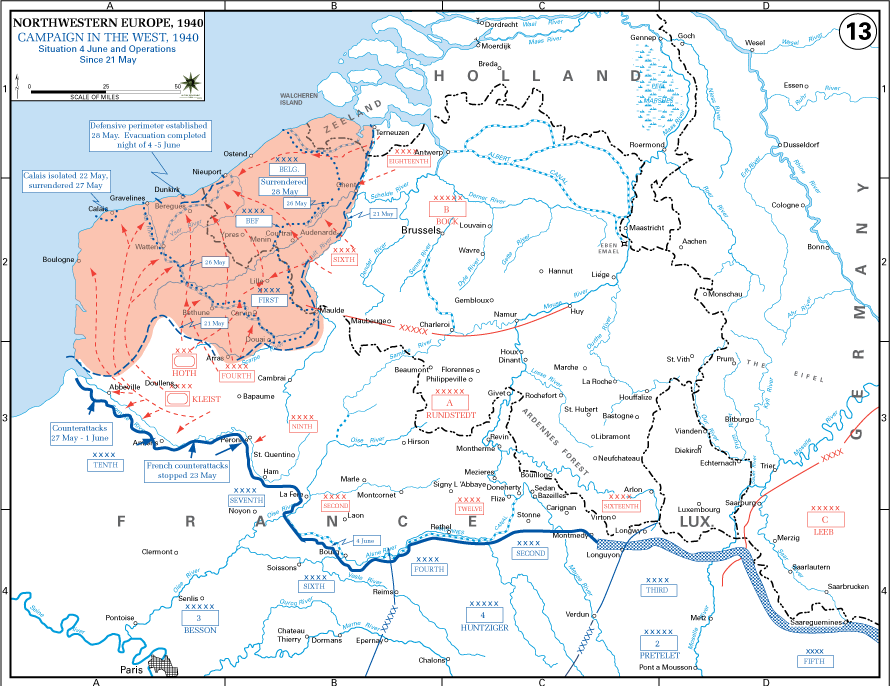
Situation from 21 May – 4 June 1940

The German offensive in June sealed the defeat of the Allies

Chart 4 contains the radio intercept results which had been obtained up to the time when German Army Groups B and A moved into position for their attack across the Somme and Aisne on 4 and 7 June.

For this operation Army Group B, which had left the Euskirchen Fixed Intercept Station in northern France to intercept the United Kingdom's traffic, was assigned the 56th Intercept Company of Army Group A, which has been stationed near Le Cateau-Cambrésis. Army Group A was assigned the 18th Intercept Company, the third to be released from the East. Thus, each army group again had two motorized intercept companies at its disposal: Army Group B having the 26th and 56th Intercept Companies; Army Group A having the 3rd and 18th Intercept Companies; and Army Group C having the 9th and 57th Intercept Companies.

On 5 June, when Army Group B crossed the River Somme, radio messages were intercepted which indicated that the enemy was concerned about the impending German attack because insufficient progress had been made in completing the positions between Fismes and Moselle. On the same day British traffic was heard for the last time on the Continent (until 1944) and brigades of the 51st (Highland) Division were identified. A plaintext intercept, according to which French troops that had escaped to England from the pocket of encircled forces in the north were to be returned to Cherbourg, was forwarded to the Luftwaffe, so that the French could be attacked by air.

On 16 June, the day following Army Group A's crossing of the River Aisne, the main radio station of the French Ministry of War, which also served the French High Command, closed down and turned over its functions to the main station at Tours, which was then assumed to be the new command post of General Maxime Weygand.

Chart 4 radio intelligence findings during the French campaign.

Allies radio traffic from the area between the Oise and River Marne had already stopped on 12 June. On that day, however, messages were intercepted from the French Fourth Army, which had long been sought in vain. Germany continued to carry out direction-finding operations in the Châlons-en-Champagne area, but no further details could be ascertained.

A radio message intercepted on 13 June, revealed the decision of the French High Command to retreat behind the River Loire.

On 15 June, French radio traffic began to show signs of complete disorganisation. HQs called each other in vain, blind messages became more frequent; the percentage of plaintext messages rose; various code designations were used, although it must have been realized that they were not secure. The confusion in radio operations pointed to the growing disintegration of French forces. Radio intelligence of the pursuing German army groups had to restrict itself to following the movements of only the senior staff, particularly of the army HQ. This information is shown in Chart 4.

In front of Army Group C, the intercept service had kept the area behind the fortified front under surveillance since 10 May. Its mission was chiefly to find out whether, under the stress of the fighting in the north and centre, units of the French 2nd, 3rd, 4th, 5th and 8th Armies were pulled out of their positions and moved to this part of the front.

About three days before the attack, in order to pin down the units along a fortified front, Germany began to transmit fake messages in conjunction with other tactical deceptions in the area of the boundary between the Wehrmacht 1st Army and 7th Armies. These measures simulated the traffic of an improvised army consisting of mobile units under the control of three corps HQs. The deceptive messages apparently caused concern, when on 10 May the volume of traffic increased noticeably from the area of the French 3rd and 4th Armies. There was no indications of any weakening of the fortified front until this traffic was discontinued.

Not before 28 May was it clearly established that a mobile division of the French Second Army has been moved out of position and transferred to the west. On the basis of its transmission characteristics, its movements could be followed as far as the Montdidier area. On the other hand, it was impossible to trace the location of the French Fourth Army, which on the following day, ceased to transmit from the fortified area. Nor did the radio picture reveal that its sector had been taken over by the adjacent French Third Army and Fifth Armies. The withdrawal of the Sixth and Tenth Army HQs, which assumed command behind the lower Somme on 23 May, was not detected by radio interception, because the intelligence mission assigned to Army Group C had not included coverage of the Swiss and Italian border. It was not known whether the fixed intercept stations under OKH which were assigned exclusively to long-range intelligence, obtained any information.

When Army Group C commenced operations on the Saar front and crossed the Upper Rhine, the intercept companies were given the mission of keeping track of those French units in the intermediate area which were capable of carrying out mobile operations. Along the fortified front the Allies on the whole observed excellent radio discipline, which continued until Germany attacked on the Marne–Rhine Canal and ran into the Polish 1st Grenadiers Division and the 2nd Division. As a result of the advance of the army on the left of Army Group A (Chart 4), the area covered by the three intercept companies was rapidly narrowed down, so that soon the same difficulties were encountered as during the observation of the northern pocket. Here too, the results of radio intelligence were not as effective as those obtained by ground reconnaissance. Nevertheless, it was possible to detect in time, around 15 June, the assembly of French forces near Vesoul which led to the attempted break-through onto the Langres Plateau.

As the encircled area became narrower, there appeared the same demoralization of radio traffic as had been observed in the northern pockets and during the pursuit in the Loire.

After 20 June, when the French High Command requested an armistice, there was no longer any possibility of systematic radio intelligence in front of the three German army groups, as the Allies no longer possessed a well-defined command structure.

After the campaign in the West, captured documents, cipher devices and machines, radio equipment of all types, confirmed and supplemented the picture, which Germany had pieced together from the radio traffic of Great Britain and France armies, and permitted them to make a fairly accurate evaluation of the security of the Allies systems. Except for their effective cryptographic systems, the Allies had made no attempt to achieve adequate radio secrecy. Under these circumstances the Allies intercepted messages did not have to be solved, since German radio intelligence could score valuable and strategic successes by carefully observing transmission characteristics on those frequencies employed by the allies and by plotting the location of these units.

German radio intelligence would have been denied these successes if the Allies stations had changed their frequencies, call signs, and operating signals at irregular intervals and if they had observed the cardinal rule of communication secrecy, namely, that one should use radio only in the following cases:

- When wire communication cannot be used, e.g. in communication with reconnaissance forces, including inter-unit communications within such forces; in communication with armoured units, or airborne units and in air-ground communication.
- When wire communications facilities have been destroyed and the messages to be sent cannot under any circumstances be delayed until wire communication has been restored.
- When wire communication functions too slowly to transmit urgent messages, such as alert orders, or air attack warnings.
- When wire communication facilities have been captured by the enemy.

Colonel Kunibert Randewig believed that the Allies' radio operations during the campaign in the west gave the impression that these rules had not been taken seriously.

=== Intercept operations against Great Britain (1940–1941) ===
Chart 5. Intercept units movements during Signal intelligence operations by Germany against Great Britain between July 1940 to January 1941.

After the conclusion of the Campaign in the West, OKH ordered Army Group A to initiate radio intelligence operations against the British Isles.

This intelligence mission, which was given in the form of a preliminary order on 2 July 1940, was supplemented by mid July with requests for the following specific information:

1. Present location of former British Expeditionary Force units.
2. Organisation, strength, and disposition of Regular Army and Territorial Army forces in the British Isles, as well as of forces shipped to England from the Dominions, with special emphasis on Canadian troops.
3. Transfer of units from Great Britain for service in the Balkans and Middle East.
4. Defensive measures initiated by permanent coastal defence forces and mobile defence forces.
5. Coverage of the coastal strip from Folkestone, Hastings, Eastbourne, Brighton, Worthing and of London, Chatham, Margate, Dover, Portsmouth, Reading, London area, these being the immediate objectives for the German invasion in according with plans for Operation Seeloewe.

For carrying out this mission, the commander of intercept troops attached to Army Group A was placed in charge of the following units:

1. The Münster Fixed Intercept Station, was at the disposal of OKH, and was moved from Münster to The Hague after the Capitulation in the Netherlands and Denmark.
2. The Euskirchen Fixed Intercept Station (which was made temporarily mobile) hitherto attached to Army Group B.
3. 26th Intercept Company, hitherto attached to Army Group B.
4. 56th Intercept Company, which during the first part of the campaign was attached to Army Group, and during the second part, to Army Group B.

OKH did not grant the request for the transfer of the Husum Fixed Intercept Station until late October 1940.

The fixed intercept stations were the only ones which had years of experience observing routine British traffic. The experience of the intercept companies was limited to the relatively brief period when they had operated against the British Expeditionary Forces on the continent during the Blitzkrieg campaign. While the British forces were being assembled from September 1939 to May 1940, no noteworthy results were obtained. The use of intercept companies in peacetime to observe British maneuvers in the home country had been impossible because of the great distance, which was between 350 and 600 miles. The 56th Intercept Company had never intercepted British traffic at all.

The transfer of the Münster station to The Hague determined the nature of its operations. Reception was extraordinary improved by the reduction in distance to the target areas and by the fact that the intercepting was undertaken exclusively over water. The results obtained by the Münster station had to serve as the basis for the operation of the three other intercept units.

The following intercept units were assigned missions by 5 July 1940 as indicated:

- The Euskirchen station in Neufchâtel-Hardelot was to search the long and medium wavelengths from the base line Ostend to Saint-Valery-en-Caux.
- The 26th Intercept Company in Étretat searched similar wavelength frequencies from the baseline at Saint-Valery-en-Caux to Caen.
- The 56th Intercept Company in Paramé search the same frequency bands from the base line Cherbourg to Brest.

The staff commander of intercept troops, together with an evaluation centre, was located at Army Group A HQ at St Germain En Laye close to Paris. It was connected with its four, and after 1 November 1940, five subordinate units by direct wire lines.

After the middle of October 1940, the commander of intercept troops was assigned a mobile long-range D/F platoon for the interception of Shortwave signals. After numerous unsuccessful trials, this platoon worked along several baselines, but without obtaining any important results.

The evaluation reports were sent daily to the main OKH intercept station, to the HQ of Army Group A and its subordinates, the 16th Army, 9th Army and 6th Army, to the military commanders of the Netherlands, Belgium, Northern France and Paris, to the Luftwaffe (Luftnachrichten Abteilung 350) and to the naval commander in Paris (B-Dienst). The operations of the intercept units, including the intercept areas as shown in Chart 5.

In spite of intensive searching during the first four weeks, during July 1940, it was impossible to intercept any messages of the kind which had been sent by mobile elements of the British Expeditionary Force on the Continent. A few messages were picked up, but they could neither be followed for any length of time, nor assigned to any regular net traffic, and were frequently so brief as to preclude even the taking of accurate bearings. The few messages intercepted, though encrypted in a rather simple field cipher, were not enough for cryptanalysis purposes. In the final evaluation, these observations were interpreted to mean that the seriously defeated divisions of the British Expeditionary Force first had to be reorganised, reequipped and rehabilitated, and in any event were not ready for large-scale training exercises.

Regular traffic was received from what was believed from fixed intercept stations operating as Coastal Defense Section Stations with stations in Chatham, Portsmouth, Southampton, Plymouth, Cardiff and Edinburgh with a network control station near London. This traffic was easily intercepted because of the failure to change Call signs and frequencies. Messages handled by this net provided material for the first attempts at cryptanalysis. However, there was hardly any change to draw conclusions of a tactical nature from the traffic analysis of the coast defence net, since it was apparently operated by well trained personnel who observed strict radio discipline. Of no importance were some Plaintext intercepts, such as:

- Italy has the shape of a foot; with the other one Mussolini is standing in his grave.
- Hitler says there are no more islands, but St. Helena is an island.
- The abandonment of the Channel Islands was a mistake which could have been avoided.

After this initial period, which extended through August and September 1940, radio traffic emanating from mobile units increased in volume. By means of radio bearings four training areas (See Chart 5) could be plotted.

1. The South Downs including Sussex, Kent and Surrey,
2. Norfolk with Wells-next-the-Sea, the first locality identified,
3. York, between the Humber and River Tees,
4. Monmouth, along the northern shore of the Bristol Channel.

In the beginning, the training exercises in these areas were still characterized by the same excellent radio discipline which was observed by the fixed nets, such as rapid tuning of transmitters preparatory to operation, brevity, and speed of transmission, and avoidance of requests for repeat. In spite of the use of a single frequency for each net and the systematic use of call signs, inter-net relationships could only be guessed at; it was impossible to draw any conclusions from them regarding the organisation structure. No cryptographic errors were committed which would have led to the solution of British ciphers.

Transmission efficiency gradually diminished. Names of localities appeared in the clear, and in the course of time abbreviations of unit designations were intercepted which were increasingly easy to identify. Thus, it was possible to locate the Norfolk training area by the terms Wells-next-the-Sea brigade, and the unit which this brigade was attached was clearly revealed by the repeat request in Plain text. Subsequently, the new numerical designations of the two London divisions were identified in the same way. Unit designations were mentioned so frequently that it was finally possible to prepare a complete list of units of the British field armies, including Canadian forces, and the composition of divisions down to infantry and artillery battalions. At the same time, the territorial HQ, as well as the Corps HQ in command of the mobile defense forces and thus the top level, also became known. All this information became available even before a single radio message could be solved. At first, the carelessness with which unit designations were revealed raised the suspicion that this was all part of a deliberate deception. The Allies would not have committed such serious violations of security rules unless their own monitoring systems were a complete failure. The accuracy of German intelligence estimates was subsequently confirmed by the contents of other messages.

As a result of the information gathered about the composition of the Allies forces, Germany increased their regular intercept coverage of the training areas, especially those in southern England, with an eye to their intended landing operations. The constantly increasing radio traffic now also permitted analysis of the nets structure and plotting of HQ areas by the D/F units. In this manner, it was possible to trace the areas of concentration of the divisions assigned to coastal defense and to follow the course of several anti-invasion exercises. During these exercises, it was always possible to determine the command nets, and sometimes the link with the Royal Air Force, while unit nets and armoured traffic would rarely be picked up at all. In several instances it was possible to distinguish between tactical and command traffic. By combining the two, the purpose of the training exercises could be inferred. It was learning that in case of a German landing, the coastal defense forces were to withdraw at first, and then destroy the Germans invasion by means of mobile tactics after reassembling and forming centres of gravity.

In the course of time, the following regions were added to the concentration and training areas of the Mobile Defense Force:

1. South Wales
2. The Midlands
3. Scotland (on both sides of the Firth of Forth)

During intercept operations, a few of the identified divisions disappeared from the radio picture for varying period of time, some altogether. Their location in the interim could not be ascertained in most cases. It was never possible to obtain reliable information about their movements overseas, which was presumed to have taken place. A coincidence led to the discovery of a troop movement from Carlisle to Belfast, which the Luftwaffe was ordered to reconnoiter and attack. Germany made the mistake of neglecting to observe overseas radio communication with adequate means at the same time they were intercepting traffic between points within Great Britain.

Nevertheless, the overall picture of the disposition of the British forces continued to be known, especially since many of the cryptographic systems in use were broken after about September 1940.

In the beginning of 1941, the radio situation in the British Isles was so well known that five intelligence units were no longer necessary for regular interception, especially after the abandonment of Operation Sea Lion (German: Unternehmen Seelöwe) for which some elements of the intercept companies had been intended.

After one intercept platoon had been transferred to the Afrika Korps, the 56th Intercept Company was given the same assignment in March 1941. About the same time, the Euskirchen station was returned from Neufchâtel-Hardelot to its peacetime location in Euskirchen. Experiments had indicated that the reception of radio waves from British Shortwave radio transmitters was immeasurably better in Euskirchen than on the coast. In April 1941, the 26th Intercept Company was transferred to eastern Europe. The subsequent coverage of Great Britain area was taken over by the fixed stations in Münster, The Hague, Husum and Euskirchen. A long range D/F organisation for long, medium and short wavelengths was retained under the direction of the commander of intercept units of Army Group D, which had assumed command in France.

==== Conclusions ====
In summary, British Army radio traffic in 1940–41 can be appraised as follows: The messages could easily be intercepted for three reasons.

- Each net operated on a single frequency, frequencies were only changed at regular intervals and the British Army used Call sign system which facilitated the identification of the NCS and secondary stations.
- Nor were these defects offset by the excellent radio discipline which the British observed in the beginning. When the latter deteriorated, even the most skillful encipherment could no longer guarantee security. Secrecy was lost by the mention of towns, areas and troop designations in the clear.
- The careless way in which radio operations were carried out suggests that the British underestimated German communication intelligence.

=== Intercept operations against Great Britain and the US (1942) ===
Chart 6. German radio intelligence operations in the Mediterranean and North Africa theatre March 1943

No substantial changes were made in the British radio system until the summer of 1942. The Bergen Fixed Intercept Station in Norway was established and it covered Great Britain, Canada, United States, and the American bases in Iceland, Greenland, and Central America. Altogether, these areas were covered by about 150 receivers. British nets could be easily detected because they continued to use call signs taken from call sign families for example "fba", "fbae", "fbb", etc. Moreover, plain text messages transmitted by phone and CW provided many valuable hints about the morale of the troops, Grid co-ordinates were easily solved even if the fliers did not make the mistakes, as was frequently the case, of radioing place names and grid coords in the clear, after which the ground stations would immediately relay the very same designations in code.

The Canadians had to a large extent adopted the British procedures (call signs, frequencies and cryptography systems) but they were distinguished by characteristic details, so that they could be identified even before cryptanalysis was instituted. The presence of the other Empire troops in the British Isles was detected by recognition of their individual characteristics. Still more revealing were the messages sent by foreign units stationed in England: Poland, Belgium, France, Norway units and others.

Until its integration into the Regular Army, the traffic of the British Home Guard showed special characteristics which made it easy to observe its activities, organisation, strength and deployment. Valuable intelligence was obtained, either through the mention of individual troop units or of tactical doctrine, by observing Royal Air Force units which were attached to the Army. Such intelligence covered a variety of subjects, including individual aircraft, liaison staffs and airfields. It enabled the Germans, for example, to follow every detail of an engagement during maneuvers, including the identification of tactical objectives as provided by British reconnaissance planes, the operations of major formations, and reports sent upon completion of a bombing mission, all from the interception of plaintext messages.

The procedure signs (in the clear) which headed each message, and used in maneuvers could be recognized immediately. Command post exercises provided an abundance of unit designations, physical location, organisation, equipment, state of training, officers names, all the information an intelligence officer needed for building up the picture of the situation. Warning exchanged between operators about impending inspections by superior staff displayed a clear lack of radio supervision.

==== Exercise Tiger ====
In the spring of 1942, Exercise Tiger, a large-scale maneuver, was carried out south of London, which lasted several days. Two motorized divisions and several RAF units participated, and their composition and strength were clearly recognized in a short time. The course of the exercise could be followed so exactly that, by sending over the Luftwaffe, Germany could have converted the maneuver into real combat action. These German intercept successes were shortly afterwards confirmed by British press and radio reports.

The same operational plan of intercept, as that described above, was applied to the Canadians during the same period. Although the distance to Canada was too great for perfect reception, it was nevertheless possible to follow newly activated units, the progress of their training, the overseas shipment of various divisions, and their subsequent movements in the British Isles.

Until the summer of 1942, no difficulties were encountered in intercepting American radio communications, with the result that inter-net relationships could be easily ascertained. From the more distant areas of the United States only the sky waves were heard, while troop exercises could not be picked up at all. Even after the subsequent co-ordination of British and American operation procedures there were still many characteristics which made it easy to distinguish the units of each Army. They used different operating signals and different abbreviations for identical service branches and units. In phone communication, differences in enumeration was the most striking contrast. Special dictionary and glossaries were provided to intercept staff to help identify idiomatic phrases.

In the United States proper, the activation of divisions and other units could be followed almost perfectly. Their stage of training could be ascertained from transfers to various camps. Their degrees of combat readiness and their impending shipment overseas became evident from the assignment of APO numbers. These APO numbers were then carefully followed. If they appeared in connection with an eastern port, for example, New York, it was clear that the unit concerned was to be shipped to Europe, whereas port designations, e.g. San Francisco, meant shipment to the Pacific.

American units were recognised after their arrival in the British Isles by the previously known APO numbers, and their subsequent whereabouts could be traced from clues similar to those provided by the British units. Thus, all major American units were currently identified.

A special source exploited by German communication intelligence was the transmission of officers' promotion notices. The typical message, in plain text began as follows:

The President intends to promote you to... Do you accept?

These "promotion messages" supplemented locator files and enabled various inferences to be drawn. If the unit of the officer in question had been previously known, but its preset station had not been traced, a promotion message transmitted, for instance, to Iceland, would thus provide Germany with its location.

In the spring of 1942, a new transmitting technique was introduced in American long-distance communications (both domestic and foreign) that dried up this excellent source of German intelligence. The Euskirchen station, which was charged with cryptanalysis of this traffic, solved the riddle within one week, however, by means of tape recordings and systematic analysis. It was finally discovered that the process used was a rapid system of wireless telegraphy which differed from the usual method by the number of current impulses, that was called "War-Type". A tremendous number of military and business messages were soon intercepted. After a short while, the receiving operators were able to "read" the messages tapes as fast as Morse code. This mistake was not discovered by the Americans until later, at which time they began to encipher these mechanically transmitted messages. Since it was no longer possible to solve them, work on these messages was discontinued.

German experience with these mechanically transmitted messages was the same everywhere, especially in the case of the German Army Ordnance Office. The transmitting techniques could be mastered easily, unless the messages were encrypted in a reliable, preferably mechanical, cipher.

In the summer of 1942, Great Britain introduced a new radio technique, which were also widely adopted by the Americans. At El Alamein, the Allies captured the entire equipment of the intercept company attached to the German Afrika Korps. As will be explained at length in the section on Africa, they recognised their former mistakes and quickly corrected them on all fronts. However, these new methods were not introduced everywhere simultaneously, but at first only in Africa. German intercept troops in Western Europe were thus able to adjust themselves in time. German communication intelligence now encountered considerably more difficulties in evaluation of the traffic. Call signs, and frequencies were changed at irregular intervals, which made it impossible to recognise inter-net relationships. It required some time and considerable experimentation before other distinguishing characteristics enabled German traffic analysis and D/F units to overcome these difficulties. The numerous, informative messages in plaintext disappeared. One of the best sources of intelligence were the careless transmissions of the Royal Air Force, over whose radio discipline the British Army apparently did not exercise any control or supervision.

==== Dieppe Raid ====
Even after the failed landings at Dieppe (Dieppe Raid), with its ensuing radio traffic, German radio intelligence did not immediately recognise what was going on. The first intercepts were received with good signal strength by The Hague Fixed Intercept Station. Somewhat later, the station in Étretat heard some extremely weak signals which failed to reveal the general situation. The Hague station had no data regarding their precise direction but, because of the strength of the signals, believed that fighting was going on in the Netherlands. With this in mind, it inquired at the local army HQ, where nothing was known. OB West had not been notified. The report was transmitted very inefficiently from the attacked units through the long chain of command to OB West. By the time that the nature and location of the event had been clarified in this irregular manner, German communication intelligence was once again working systematically. The interception of all messages from Dieppe was centrally controlled from St. Germain. Enemy messages became more numerous and informative until around noon, then remained at the same level for a while, only to become fewer with the disengagement which took place in the later afternoon, and then disappeared entirely during the cross-Channel evacuation. OB West could be informed more rapidly about every phase of the fighting through radio intelligence than through the communication channels of the field units. Encrypted messages were solved even during the course of the attack. However, the numerous code names for targets, terrain features, and the like, could not be interpreted during the brief course of the operation. Conspicuous in these codes was the frequent mention of colours. Captured documents subsequently revealed that these indicates beachhead sectors. Since this procedure was repeated during later landings, any mention of colours came to mean to German communication intelligence: "Imminent danger of invasion". When the term "withdrawal" was openly mentioned in Dieppe at the beginning of the disengagement, it became clear that this was not an attempt at invasion but that it was an operation with limited objectives with respect to time and space.

The fact that German propaganda put the venture in a different light is immaterial. When the Propaganda Ministry (German: Reichsministerium für Volksaufklärung und Propaganda) finally asked for the numerous messages containing requests for help in order to use them in the press and on the radio, all the cryptanalysed messages were omitted and messages in the clear were paraphrased to prevent the enemy from gaining any clues as to German intelligence results. Thus, German intercept operations were bound to appear far less effective that they actually had been.

=== Africa and Near East (1941–1943) ===
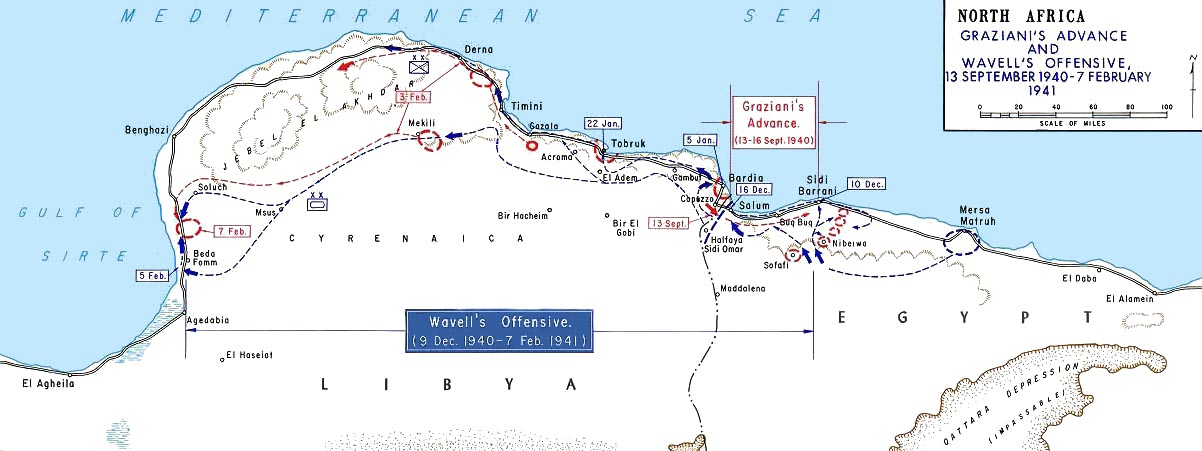
Military operations, 13 September 1940 – 7 February 1941

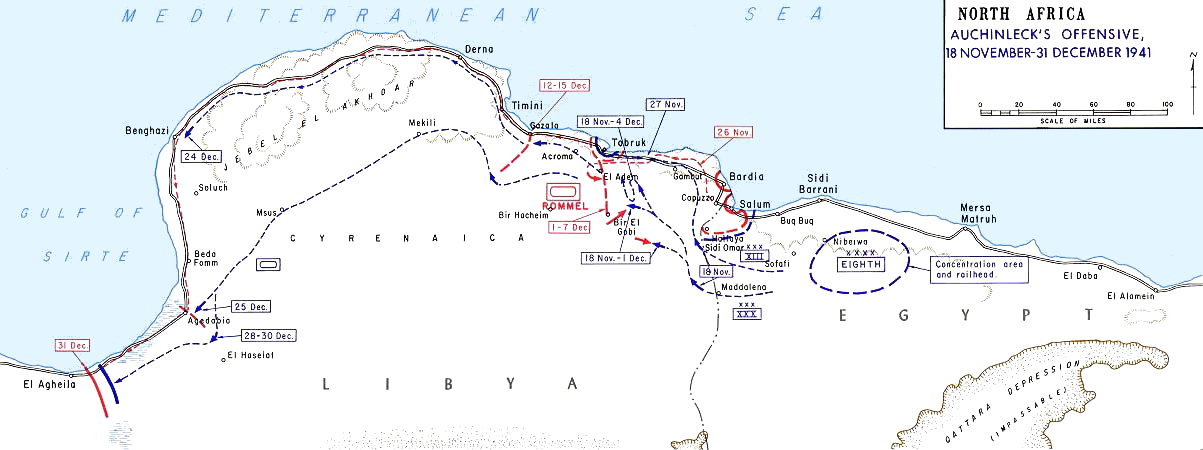
Operation Crusader, 18 November – 31 December 1941

In February 1941, Erwin Rommel landed in Africa, and during the first half of 1941, the Government Code and Cypher School at Bletchley Park was reading the Luftwaffe Mediterranean Enigma key which they code-named "Light Blue", which enabled them to follow German convoy routes between Italy and North Africa for most of 1941.

In March 1941, the German units which would be later called the Africa Corps, were given one intercept platoon, which was soon enlarged into an intercept company to which were assigned English-language cryptanalysts from the intercept command station. The company was equipped with receivers and D/F instruments suitable for use in a tropical climate. The personnel had had experience in intercepting British traffic ever since the Campaign in the West and therefore knew the weaknesses of the British radio system. During operations against the UK, Germany arrived at the conclusion that the British were underestimating the successes of German communication intelligence, and this became even more obvious in Africa. Here, in mobile Desert warfare, radio was the only possible form of communication—a medium as dangerous as it was valuable—the British used it more carelessly than ever. A clear and accurate picture of the opposing British Eighth Army with regard to all the details of its composition, the origin of its divisions, and its morale and plans, was rapidly gained as a result of the mistakes described in the preceding section. These mistakes included

- plaintext Radiotelephone and telegraph messages mentioning geographical data
- Individual names
- Unit designations
- Failure to mask such terms properly
- Extremely simple ciphers
- Routine call signs

These types of mistakes were possibly part of a deception scheme run by the Advanced Headquarters 'A' Force unit, or sloppy radio procedures used before the retraining undertaken by the British Eighth Army under the command of Lieutenant-General Bernard Montgomery in early-mid 1942 (North African Campaign#Western Desert Campaign); The information which the intercept company of the Africa Corps gathered was mainly of the short-range type, supplemented by long-range intelligence carried out by the Office of the Commander of Communication Intelligence, of which there were four in the Balkans, who operated against British forces in the Near East. German intelligence in Africa also had some exceptionally lucky breaks, e.g., when it was able to report on impending British operations after solving messages sent by the American liaison officer.

==== British ciphers captured ====
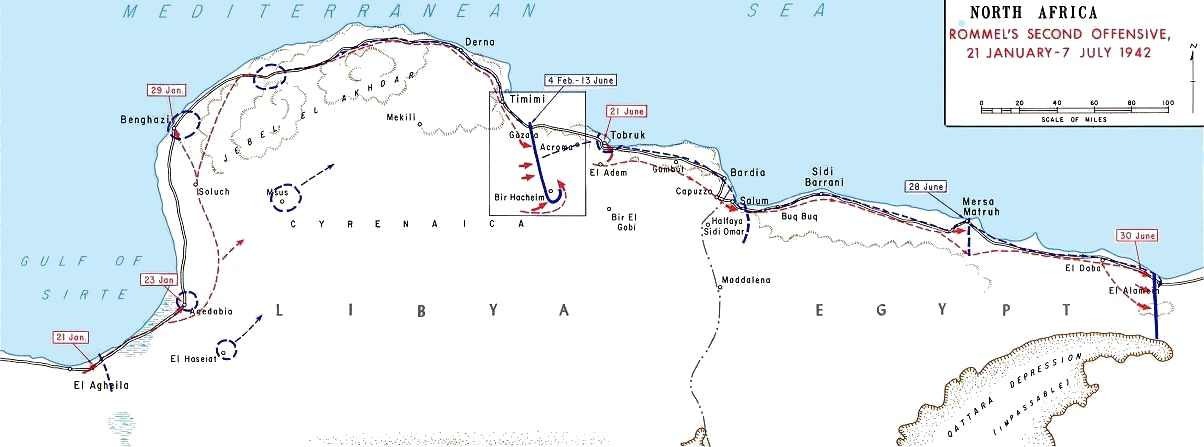
Battle of Gazala, 21 January – 7 July 1942

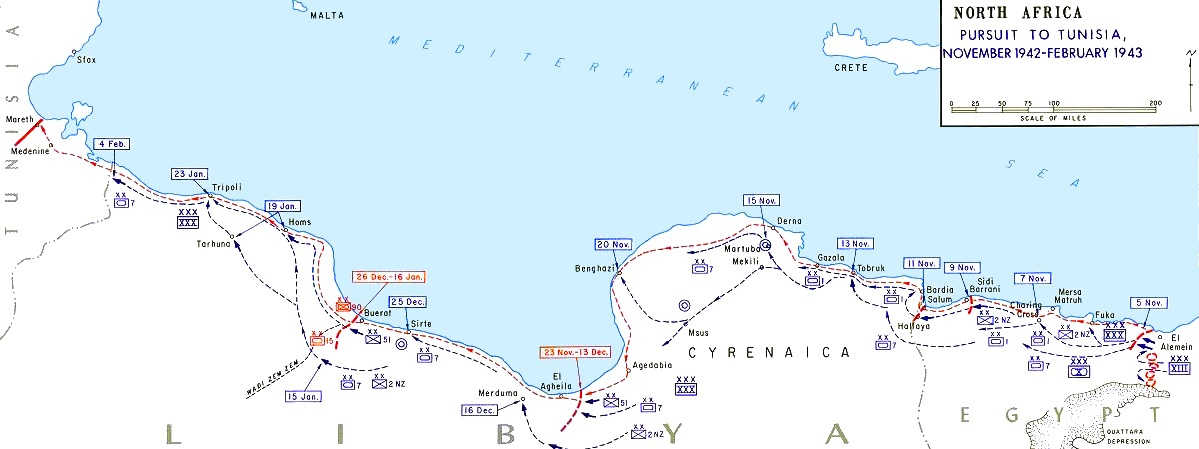
Pursuit of the Axis forces through Egypt and Libya

In the summer of 1942, a German submarine operating in the eastern Mediterranean captured a ship on which was found a complete set of radio codes used jointly by services of the British armed forces in the Mediterranean theatre from Gibraltar to Egypt. The security of radio communication in this area was a matter of vital concern in safeguarding the British supply line. The submarine, which had been assigned to other tasks, was immediately recalled after reporting this valuable prize. Because it was then possible to decrypt rapidly all British radio communications using these codes, German countermeasures at sea and in the air were especially successful for the next two weeks. Then this traffic ceased entirely. The British had become suspicious and did not resume radio operations until six weeks later, after couriers had been able to deliver new codes throughout this far-flung theatre of operations.

The results obtained by communication intelligence provided Field Marshal Erwin Rommel with accurate information. His talent for gaining unexpected success in armoured warfare, where radio communication played a pivotal role, had already brought him a number of victories as a commander of a 7th Panzer Division in the Campaign in the West. In the desert, Rommel encouraged this new method of tactical reconnaissance, especially since the results or German air reconnaissance were limited by British air superiority. To facilitate the detailed evaluation or information by the intercept company, Rommel's chief of staff always had two field trunk circuits at his disposal to handle incoming telephone and teletype traffic. During all his inspection trips to the front, Rommel was personally informed by radio about all important results obtained by radio intelligence. It may be assumed that the British did not employ any radio intelligence of their own against the German Africa Corps; at least they did not succeed in solving Rommel's codes. Thus, German radio intelligence was able to work unsuspected by the British.

==== Deception plans ====
By means of these modem techniques, Rommel was able to carry on a kind of desert warfare as long as Allies superiority was not overwhelming. In this theatre, Rommel also made use of radio deception by having several radio stations simulate large forces, far to the south in the desert and suggest an encirclement. On repeated occasions radio intelligence was able to observe that the British were taken in by this stratagem, and that apparently without any confirmation by their reconnaissance planes, they sent tanks and motorized artillery, once even an armoured division, to oppose the fictitious Axis allies. On one other occasion, however, German radio intelligence was unable to detect a British armoured division which had advanced far to the south, since it had observed absolute radio silence for several weeks, as was subsequently confirmed by a captured regimental commander. This was part of the detailed deception plan, earlier called Plan Collect and later called Operation Bertram, that was ordered by Claude Auchinleck, Bernard Montgomery, and principally designed by the master of deception Dudley Clarke, who was part of Advanced Headquarters 'A' Force. It successfully deceived Rommel into believing an attack was coming from the south. Indeed, it was said that the "British Eighth Army practiced deception on a scale unequaled in military history."

One interesting observation by this company was the interception of appeals for assistance and water sent by radio to the British Eighth Army by the German Communist Battalion commanded by Ludwig Renn in the desert fort of Bir Hakeim, south of Tobruk.

In front of El Alamein, the intercept company was able to report the reinforcement of the British forces and their preparations for an attack with which the German-Italian forces could not possibly cope. The intercept company and its evaluation centre were imprudently stationed far in advance of Rommel's headquarters and only a few kilometers behind an Italian sector of the front which was subsequently penetrated by British tanks in late October 1942. While defending itself the company lost more than 100 dead; the company commander was seriously wounded and died in a Cairo military hospital. Because of the surprise achieved by the tank attack, there was no opportunity to destroy the valuable intercept files. Thus, the Allies captured the German records of intercepted British messages and codes, the analysis prepared by the German intercept service, as well as German and Italian radio schedules and ciphers.

Radio Cairo reported: "The distinguished Captain Seebohm has been seriously wounded and is a prisoner of war. We are much obliged for the extensive amount of excellent materiel we have captured."

The British reaction to the capture of the German intercept receivers has been mentioned. In a very short time the British corrected their numerous, costly mistakes after they had become fully aware of their damaging effects. This applied not only to the African theatre, where the German command lost its reliable sources of intelligence (Bonner Fellers), but also to all future British and American operations in North Africa, Italy, and France. Other sections of this study describe how German communication intelligence was for the most part capable of overcoming even these difficulties after a period of experimentation, during which results diminished, and how in the heat of combat or when opposed by less disciplined units, the Allies repeated the same mistakes over and over again.

==== Short- and long-range radio intelligence ====
The successes of the German radio intelligence units under Rommel before El Alamein might well be considered as products of short-range intelligence. The main efforts of German long-range intelligence as well were directed toward the east, where momentous events appeared to be imminent. The German forces in Egypt were dangerously close to the Suez Canal. The southernmost German elements 1n Russia stood in the Northern Caucasus and were advancing southward. Coverage of the situation in Egypt, Palestine, Transjordsn, Syria, Iraq, and neutral Turkey, therefore, appeared of prime importance to the Germans. The possibility of an Allied landing on the western or northwestern coast of Africa was virtually disregarded. Only the Dakar area seemed to be of interest, inasmuch as an unusual amount of American radio traffic was observed there.

In addition to the intercept company assigned to the Panzer Army of Africa, the intercept units mentioned in the section on the Balkan Campaigns covered the above-mentioned areas from stations extending from El Alamein, to Crete, Athens, Thessaloniki, Kavala, and Burgaz. These units operated under the Commander of Communication Intelligence (Four) in Athens, who was subordinate first to OB Southeast (German: OB Südost) in Thessaloniki, later to the commander of Army Group F, Field Marshall (German: Generalfeldmarschall) Maximilian von Weichs in Belgrade. (OB Suedeast was simultaneously commander of Army Group E.) (See Chart 6).

==== Little success ====
Except for the results obtained from observing the British Eighth Army, German radio intelligence had little success, inasmuch as nothing important could be intercepted except British command messages, which could not be solved. German radio intelligence worked together with its Italian counterpart against the British. This cooperation was extremely cordial, but furnished few results of any importance. Turkey was covered in collaboration with the Bulgarian intelligence service. Turkish radio operations and cryptographic systems were extremely primitive and in no way met minimum standards of security. Radio intelligence furnished the usual information about the organisation of the Turkish Army, its mobilization plans, and shipments of Allied military material, especially aircraft. The receiving units were informed in advance by radio of the arrival of the shipments. This information was, however, of no importance from the standpoint of German military operations.

The proposal to supplement radio intelligence operations, then directed exclusively against the east, by a chain of intercept stations directed toward the south and extending approximately from the Balearic Islands to Sardinia, Sicily, and Crete was rejected, since Anglo-American landings in Africa were believed out of the question because of the vulnerability of Allied supply routes to submarine attack. In addition, there were supposedly not enough intercept units available for such a precautionary measure.

French colonial radio traffic, with its fixed links in Morocco and Algiers, was intercepted by the Orléans Fixed Intercept Station, which was subsequently transferred to Montpellier. This traffic, including ciphers, as well as that handled by lower echelon units, presented no unusual difficulties. As was the case in France proper in 1940, colonial radio communication provided reliable clues to garrison locations and unit strengths. The known types of radio traffic in North Africa continued to function normally until the Anglo-American landings, thus providing no indication that a landing was imminent.

==== Allied invasion of French North Africa ====
Long before the Allied landings in French West and Northwest Africa, German radio intelligence intercepted messages emanating from a large American air transport and supply organisation in Equatorial Africa. The information and development of this organisation could be followed in detail. It consisted of two east–west lines operating from coast to coast with lateral links and branch lines to the north. Information was thus secured regarding the establishment and operation of bases in Central Africa, the arrival of air and sea transports from America at points along the west coast, transport flights across Africa, and the loading of freighters. The intercepts provided no direction indicator of an impending landing. Nor were such conclusions apparently drawn by the Western Intelligence Branch or the Armed Forces Operations Staff on the basis of these striking intercepts concerning such a large-scale supply operation.

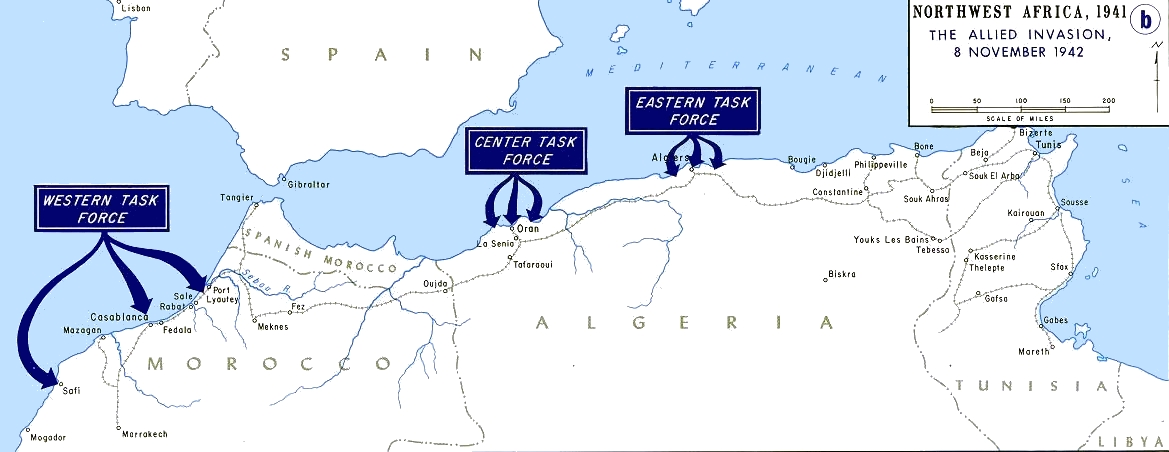
Allied invasion of French North Africa as part of the North African Campaign, 8 November 1942

The Allied landings in French West and North Africa on 7 November 1942, Operation Torch, came as a surprise because of the secrecy afforded by radio silence. The unpredictable skywave radiation on the short wavelengths, preferred by the British and Americans for military traffic, was responsible for accidental success on the part of German radio intelligence. The intercept stations in Norway, the Netherlands, and France which covered the west, chiefly England, picked up almost all Allied messages following the landing and were able to work without the assistance of D/F stations to the south, since a sufficient number of localities were mentioned in Allied messages. On the first day of the landing the Bergen Fixed Intercept Station received the messages with good signal strength. Bergen immediately recognized their importance and reported them to St. Germain. Since the traffic resembled that used at Dieppe, especially with regard to the use of colours to designate beachhead sectors, there was no longer any doubt that a landing had occurred.

Even during the first few hours the landing forces were reporting "no resistance", and the like. It was apparent therefore that the French did not resist the landing but in fact assisted it in some places, whereas Vichy continued to report stubborn French resistance for days.

In spite of or because of the long distances, the signals in question were also well received in the St. Germain area, even including traffic between regiment and battalion, since the short wavelengths were used almost exclusively. A large volume of messages was received, which was not surprising in view of the strong Allied forces committed. There is nothing new to be said about enemy radio procedure at that time. In spite of all attempts at uniformity American traffic could still be distinguished from the British. The former was generally characterized by greater carelessness. Field codes and ciphers were solved and a large number of careless messages in clear text appeared once again.

==== Intelligence gathered ====
German radio intelligence gathered information about the following points: all beachheads, the neutralisation or desertion of French troops, the progress of the advance into the interior, same of the advance routes and objectives, supply problems, co-operation between air and ground units, the order of battle of the landing forces and their tactical organisation during the advance. After the arrival of the first elements of General Hans-Jürgen von Arnims 5th Panzer Army, reports were heard from armoured reconnaissance elements about German positions, movements, and engagements. Added to these were the usual details, such as names of officers and reports of casualties, armament, and equipment; in short, the entire course of events was followed in detail by a branch of German communication intelligence that actually was assigned an entirely different mission on another front. It is hardly an exaggeration to say that during at least the first phase of this campaign almost 100 per cent of the Germans information about the allies in this new theatre was provided by communication intelligence.

==== OB Southwest ====
The next step was to forward this information to the German forces in Africa without undue loss or time. At that time OKH approved the essential features or the once-rejected plans for establishing a theatre of operations, i.e. OB Suedwest and the requisite measures were swiftly taken. First, an army intercept company, supported by a Luftwaffe communication intelligence unit (Luftnachrichten Abteilung 350), was sent to Taormina in Sicily, and later, for technical reasons, to Marsala at the western tip of the island. There the company operated quite successfully, since it was close to the front and the Americans still failed to observe radio discipline. This unit rendered valuable service to the German command.

In February 1943, the position of Commander of Canmunication Intelligence (Seven) was created with an evaluation centre in Rocca di Papa, south of Rome, under OB Southwest and commanded by Field Marshal Albert Kesselring, whose headquarters was in nearby Frascati.

==== Command structure ====
According to Chart 6 the Commander of Communication Intelligence (Seven) was in command or the following units: the remnants or the former intercept company which had been attached to the Panzer Army of Africa, together with the local Italian communication intelligence company, for operations against the British Eighth Army; one communication intelligence company in Sicily for observing the British First Army in Africa; and the Montpellier station in France for intercepting French traffic in Africa. The latter unit was subsequently used at Rocca di Papa for other duties. The Commander of Communication Intelligence (Four) in Athens continued to direct his attention towards the east. In addition, surveillance of partisans in the Balkans was carried on.

==== Direction finding ====
Direction-finding operations against Africa were organised as follows:

- D/F Network A: Headquarters in Sicily. Stations in Sardinia and Gabes, North Africa. Objective: British First Army.
- D/F Network B: Headquarters in Gabes, North Africa. Stations in Sicily and Crete. Objective: British Eighth Army.
- D/F Network C: Based at Rocca di Papa and Montpeller. Duties: to check D/F operations and to assign missions connected with the analysis of D/F data to networks A and B, or to individual D/F stations. (See Chart 6)

Chart 7. German Communication Circuits used by Intercept Units in Africa and Near East March 1943.

In the widespread operations of these units under the Commander of Communication Intelligence (Seven), safe and rapid inter-unit communication was just as essential to their effective operation as were communication media in general to all using agencies. Because of the nature of the theatre of operations, radio communication was of the greatest importance. This was true of communication across water and desert, and also of that in Italy, where wire communication was restricted to the north–south trunk circuit (COML), which was frequently interrupted. Since shortwave transmitters were required for such great distances and since the Army did not possess a sufficient number, the 70-watt short-wave transmitter used by the Navy was considered preferable and accordingly was procured. Its operation is shown in Chart 7. In addition to the communication circuits shown in this chart there were also special radio nets serving in the extensive direction finding system. The Luftwaffe provided the Commander of Communication Intelligence with channels in the microwave (decimetre) circuit between Sicily and Tunis, which was extended southward by an open wire line to the intercept company near Gabès. Similarly the Luftwaffe furnished other channels by lending its radio telephone line between Rome and Sicily to Army communication intelligence. Since the evaluation centres also needed the original texts of radiotelephone and telegraph messages, these were forwarded by the daily Rome-Sicily courier planes and the courier plane which came from Africa every two days.

==== Awaiting attack ====
In early March 1943 the Germany were awaiting the attack of the British Eighth Army against the Panzer Army of Africa and its Italian components, which had withdrawn along the coast all the way from Egypt to the Gabès area. However, there was no clue as to when the attack would begin. Then on 13 March the following message was picked up from a British battalion:

Remember to observe radio silence until 2200 hours 16 March.

The Commander of Communication Intelligence immediately reported this to the chief of staff the Army group, adding the question:

Does this indicate a major operation?

When a similar message was picked up the following night, Kesselring was awakened, whereupon he flew to Africa in order to examine the defense preparations and to brief his Commanders. The attack began, as predicted, on the evening of 16 March, and found the German troops prepared to defend themselves.

Because of the favorable results obtained by communication intelligence units, its relations with all Army and Luftwaffe headquarters were excellent. For example, at a conference in the headquarters of OB Suedwest, the Commander of Communication Intelligence reported a British message just received which revealed that there was a considerable traffic jam in a certain wadi, the location of which could not be determined by cryptanalysis but could be surmised, since several columns were blocking the wadi. Kesselring radioed orders for planes to reconnoiter the wadi. Air reconnaissance confirmed the intercept while the conference was still in progress, and a short time later a report was received that the troop concentration had been successfully bombed.

One day, because of a breakdown in tactical signal communication and the resulting lack of reports, the operations officer (G-3) for OB Southwest was without any information concerning the latest front-line developments. Communication intelligence was able to show him its own accurate situation map, which had been compiled exclusively from intercepted reconnaissance reports made by Allied units.

Other intercepted messages affected military discipline, as, for example, when the British stated that they could observe the course of the German positions southeast of Sfax because the German troops were not using any cover or concealment while entrenching. Another message gave the exact number of German vehicles because their windshields were not camouflaged and reflected the sunlight.

==== Allied invasion of Sicily ====
Errors in interpretation also occurred. However, such instances were rare, since all unconfirmed reports were given "With reservations". For example, prior to the invasion of Sicily, a British message spoke of a successful landing. Since only one direction-finding team was available, only one bearing could be taken. The reading suggested a point on the southern coast of Sicily. As was subsequently revealed, no landing on Sicily had taken place, but a landing exercise had been carried out on islands off the African coast which lay in the path of the bearing taken. This experience made the intelligence analysts more cautious in their judgments. As a result, one of them did not immediately report a landing on the Italian mainland from Sicily; because he believed that this, too, was a training exercise. In this case, however, it was the real invasion.

Map of the Allied landings in Sicily on 10 July 1943.

The Communication Intelligence Commander's request to save the intelligence company in Africa from impending capture and thus preserve it for future action by transferring it to Italy was turned down because of Hitler's order that no men or equipment were to be evacuated from Africa. Thus, only a small part of the valuable personnel and radio equipment could be saved. The conduct of the personnel of the company, with whom radio contact was maintained until the arrival of the enemy tanks, was excellent. They reported that they had destroyed all valuable materiel, and that every man was aware of his duty after being captured.

=== Sicily and Italy 1943–1945 ===
Since enemy air superiority seriously hampered German air reconnaissance during the fighting in Sicily and Southern Italy, communication intelligence played a more and more important role. One corps commander summed up this trend by saying he no longer needed an intelligence officer (G-2) for compiling reports on the enemy situation, since the only available sources of information were the intercepts furnished by communication intelligence.

==== Allied radio silence ====
In the course of the numerous landings during the following months the Allies was again able to achieve surprise by maintaining radio silence. In between landings, however, German communication intelligence was able to gain information that was instrumental in countering these landings.

During the fighting in Sicily an intercepted message, revealing a planned minor landing on the northern shore of the island, was transmitted not only to OB Southwest and to Korps Hube commanded by Hans-Valentin Hube, which was then fighting in Sicily, but also to the intelligence officer of Luftwaffe commander, Field Marshal (German: Generalfeldmarschall) Wolfram Freiherr von Richthofen. The intelligence officer did not report this message immediately, but waited until the regular staff meeting, which was held later. Consequently, the Luftwaffe was unable to carry out counterattacks in time. Richthofen was furious and immediately ordered that in the future all such reports should not go through channels but should be sent directly to him or his chief of staff and simultaneously also to the Luftwaffe field agencies concerned. During a similar but bigger landing, which was supported by Naval artillery, another message intercepted by radio intelligence resulted in the timely and effective bombing of the enemy's ships offshore, which compelled him to call off the operation.

During the fighting at Enna in Sicily, a German war correspondent picked up a broadcast concerning radio intelligence and its successes in Sicily which had been foolishly sent out by German civilian stations. After only a few days, the conduct of the Allied radio operators revealed that this indiscretion had not escaped the enemy's attention and that he was taking countermeasures.

The Germans were able to withdraw the radio intelligence company stationed near Marsala in Sicily to the Reggio area without loss of personnel or equipment and without interrupting operations. Later, the same company could carry out additional leapfrog moves to the Salerno and Rocca di Papa areas.

==== German centralization of intercept ====
In contrast to the former decentralized method of employing radio intelligence units, a more efficient policy of centralization was now instituted, and this radical though effective change in procedure was continued up to the end of the war. This centralization was in keeping with the geographic features of the Italian theatre, as well as the more conventional type of warfare carried on there. The long peninsula, bounded on both sides by the sea, reduced the opportunities for local direction-finding operations. In addition, reception was unfavorably influenced by the Apennines and later the Alps. Instead of enemy flank attacks, the Germans expected enemy landings on the east and west coasts, such as were later carried out on a large-scale at Salerno and Nettuno. With shorter distances to the target areas, operations could be kept under close control with the help of good communication. Having been selected as the ideal method, centralized communication intelligence intercepted and evaluated all types of traffic at one place, from which the information was forwarded to all interested agencies over short lines of communication. The evaluation personnel of the companies worked together with the personnel of the evaluation centre, thus increasing the latter's efficiency.

==== Intercept unit placement ====
The companies were stationed from three to nine miles apart, engaged only in intercepting and formed part of a large intercept centre that was controlled by those in charge of evaluation. The Commander of Communication Intelligence, General Erich Fellgiebel, maintained personal contact with OB Südwest (Army Group C) and with the Tenth and 14th Armies. In the vicinity of various corps headquarters short-range intelligence platoons were stationed, which co-operated with the respective corps intelligence officers. Here too, a solution for short-range intelligence problems was found that subsequently served as a model for other theatres.

The problem of quickly informing front line units of all intelligence reports concerning them was salved in other theatres by drastic decentralization whereby small teams were located in the vicinity of division staffs. The time-consuming route through the chain of command was thus avoided. In Italy, however, centralized intercept methods could work with greater technical efficiency, and a large evaluation centre could provide better results, in view of the languages spoken by the Allies. Thus, all tactical intelligence information of importance to the lower echelons was encrypted in a special cipher and broadcast by a powerful station, with the exception of secret operation reports, which were forwarded through the customary channels. These radio warnings saved many lives, especially among artillerymen, and were gratefully received by all. They generally referred to German positions and movements recognized by the Allies, and hence to impending air or ground attacks, as well as Allies orders or requests for artillery fire. The German troops were thus able to avoid the attacks in time.

After German radio intelligence had previously reported messages from the Italian Navy indicating Italy's approaching defection and the sailing of its fleet, it confirmed the accomplished fact of Italy's defection at end of July 1943 by means of an intercepted British radio report. The headquarters of OB Suedwest, together with the units of communication intelligence, were deprived of their land lines to Germany because the rebels had occupied Rome. In addition, they were confronted by several Italian elite divisions which displayed a hostile attitude. As was later disclosed through some remarks made by Winston Churchill, there existed the danger of an allied airborne landing for the purpose of eliminating the headquarters, a plan which was canceled at the last moment. Until the situation could be brought under control by German troops, the Commander of Communication Intelligence had to occupy a fairly extensive defense sector with a large part of his personnel tn order to protect the headquarters, while specially selected men carried on the work of radio intelligence, so important at this particular time. Despite the circumstances, they were able to furnish some valuable reports. Although there was not a sufficient number of planes available, OKW ordered the immediate transfer by air of the entire communication intelligence organisation to Army Group B stationed along the southern slopes of the Alps. The order was rescinded because of Albert Kesselring's objection.

==== Spring 1944 ====
In early 1944, the German defense forces were opposed by the British Eighth Army and the American Fifth Armies under the 15th Army Group. These troops were composed of British elements from every part of the Empire. Americans, French Moroccans, Polish Corps. This variety of nationalities frequently confounded the short-range intelligence teams of the divisions, since they could not have translators for each language. Such teams were, therefore, less important in Italy than in other theatres and their work was largely replaced by the broadcasting of radio warnings.

==== Synchronization of Allied communications ====
In evaluating the results obtained by German communication intelligence in this theatre during the last year of the war, the Allies signal personnel had learned in the course of the war to respect German communication intelligence. The Germans now had to strain every effort to detect and exploit the inevitable weaknesses in Allied radio communication. Messages which offered little prospect of success, were now given secondary consideration. These were chiefly command messages from division to higher headquarters. Main emphasis was placed on front-line traffic forward of division. The difference between long-range and short-range intelligence had gradually disappeared, since the former relied more and more on the information obtained by intercepting Allied radio traffic in the forward lines.

In Italy, the British and American forces had co-ordinated their radio techniques to such an extent that there were hardly any differences to be noticed. Apart from pronunciation and subject matter, their respective transmissions could be distinguished only by a few operating characteristics and some differences in troop designations. It was simpler to recognize units which did not speak English. The French used their old peculiar methods and were fairly easy to identify, while the Brazilians offered no difficulties at all.

==== Allied secure communications and mistakes ====
In all cases it was possible to obtain information from mistakes made by the Allies. The sending of messages in plaintext, which were often unnecessary, furnished unit designations, terrain data, and officers names. Attempts to disguise operating signals and grid co-ordinates were still unsuccessful. The cryptographic systems used by the higher echelons continued to resist analysis, but many field ciphers could be broken. In this connection it should be acknowledged to the credit of the Allies that only a few of these messages in field ciphers revealed events of tactical or strategic importance, at least not directly. On the other hand, it was frequently possible to draw conclusions. Only the French went their own way in cryptographic matters, and their systems could be easily solved. They used a small cipher device, probably of Swedish origin, the results of which were not difficult to solve. It was even possible to break the large French cipher device under certain circumstances. The cryptanalysis section of the communication intelligence clearing centre in Italy worked out a procedure which enabled the evaluation units in Italy to solve difficult mechanical ciphers. The French employed in addition so-called "worm ciphers" (German: Wurmschluessel), which were also regularly broken.

Note:These were cryptographic devices by which the key to the general system was determined by arbitrarily selected passages in some book carried by the agent, where the book could be a popular novel. It was called a worm cipher, because the key passages in question began suddenly in some part of the text, like an earthworm appearing above the surface of the ground.

On the whole, however, enemy radio communication was so good that German radio intelligence was confronted by a crisis in March 1944, since it had become almost impossible to ascertain Allied intentions in time. It had also become difficult to recognize the order of battle during the withdrawal and transfer of units, and changes in command. But then, as subsequently happened in France, the Allied air forces came to the rescue.

==== Intensive study of Allied communications ====
Intensive study of intercept covering a fairly long period disclosed a definite relationship between preparations for offensive operations and the assignment of air liaison officers to front line divisions. Assault divisions which did not have an air liaison officer were assigned one, while other divisions were assigned a second one. The air liaison nets were easy to intercept, since the system used was of a lower quality than that employed by the British and American ground forces. This knowledge in turn enabled the Germans to predict accurately when enemy attacks would begin. German Army interception of the Allied strategic air force revealed the points of main effort of reconnaissance flights, and target areas, which helped to clarify the enemy's over-all plans.

==== Trivial details providing intelligence ====
Some trivial details furnished information to communication intelligence, as is shown by the following examples: An impending attack against German defenses in the Naples area was detected in time because a small supply unit mentioned that rum was to be issued on a certain day. Since it was known that the British issued rum to their troops before an attack, it was possible to warn the German defenders. The following remark was heard over an American net:

Italians can only be used as waiters and postcard salesmen.

This wholly superfluous message, supplemented by D/F data, confirmed the presence of an American unit near Naples, as had been previously suspected. The following was heard from a British station at Valli di Comacchio:

The German troops are retreating in a hurry and even the Italians are advancing.

The presence of the British unit was already known, but this message confirmed the first employment of Italians in combat on the Allied side. The radio operator of a French unit described his anticipated amorous adventures in Naples. No French units had previously been detected at the point from which he sent his message. The Canadian and Polish divisions were also known as assault troops. Their appearance at the front and the narrow segments of the line occupied by them were additional indications of an impending attack at that point.

It is difficult to understand why the Allies, at least during position warfare in this theatre, failed to mask their offensive ground operations by maintaining radio silence just as they did during surprise landings. Unlike the situation in the desert, their telephone lines in Italy were certainly adequate for this purpose. As was the case in Russia, this carelessness was probably due to a feeling of absolute superiority. Nevertheless, the manner in which enemy radio operations were conducted offered the weaker defenders much information which cost the attackers losses which could have been avoided.

=== Defense of Western Europe 1944–1945 ===
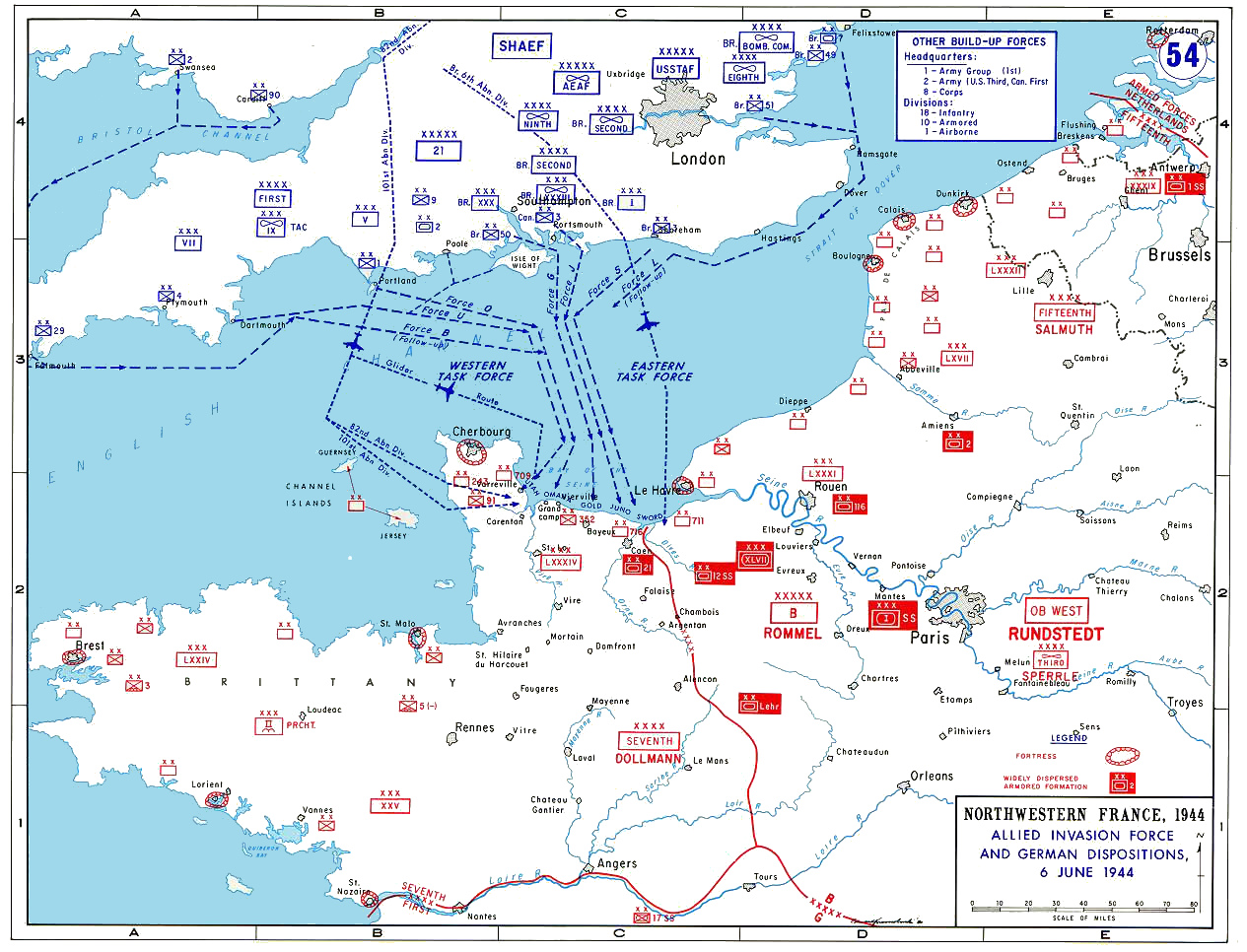
D-day assault routes into Normandy.

Following the spring of 1944, German communication intelligence in Italy noticed a shift in heavy enemy concentrations from the Mediterranean area to England. American and British elite divisions, which had previously been observed in southern Italy or elsewhere in the Mediterranean theatre, appeared in the British Isles. The following is an example of German intercept work during that period: An American airborne division (the 82nd?) had been reported for quite some time in southern Italy, when it suddenly disappeared. About three weeks later over a hitherto unidentified net in England there was transmitted a reference to the search for a soldier against whom a girl in the United States had instituted paternity proceedings. The shipment number of this soldier tallied with the code designation used by the missing airborne division. When communication intelligence reported this finding and suggested that the airborne division might have been transferred to England, the Armed Forces Operations Staff replied facetiously that the division had most likely been transported by submarine, but that no transports of this kind had been observed near Gibraltar. Nevertheless, the new radio net was put under special observation for any characteristics of this airborne division, and indisputable evidence of its presence in England was soon secured. It subsequently turned out to be one of the first invasion units to be reported.

==== Classification of Allied invasion forces ====
Chart 8a,8b. Organization of Radio Intelligence Units under OB West

The methods employed in intercept operations against Great Britain did not change substantially during the last eighteen months of the war. Chart 8a enumerates the German radio intelligence units which were available in 1944. A subsequent comprehensive evaluation prepared sometime after the start of the Allied invasion showed that approximately ninety-five per cent of the units which landed in Normandy had been previously identified in the British Isles by means of intensive radio intelligence. Thus, one may conclude that the information provided by communication intelligence was quite adequate and that the German Supreme Command was in a position to calculate the strength of the enemy forces. Locator cards, regularly issued by the communication intelligence control centre, contained precise information about newly organised divisions, and the appearance or disappearance of radio traffic from and to specific troop units. The intercepted radio activity during the numerous landing exercises furnished a picture of the projected invasion procedure. It was impossible, however, to obtain any clue as to the time and place of the landing. The radio picture did not change noticeably until the last day before the invasion. All previously known and observed types of traffic continued as usual. No radio deceptions were recognized. No kind of radio alert was observed before the landing. According to later reports the first wave sailed on short notice.

The Allies scored a great surprise on 6 June 1944 (Normandy landings) by the imposition of radio silence. Any different action would have been a grave blunder, not to be expected of an enemy who had had five years of varied wartime experience, both good and bad, with German communication intelligence and who after a long period of preparation was now launching the decisive battle of the war.

==== Invasion preparations ====
The German radio intelligence organisation in the West had been prepared for the invasion during the preceding months. Its actual beginning, therefore, brought no special changes. The entire organisation was so well integrated that it could handle the additional work-load. Gradually all monitoring of important areas, such as Ireland, Spain, Portugal and Brazil, was discontinued in order to save personnel and equipment and to release all available manpower for intercepting the traffic of the Allied forces that had landed. Since the evaluation data had been distributed to all units, it was possible to transfer the intercepting of new radio traffic from one unit to another at short notice. This was only possible, however, because all the units had thoroughly trained and experienced personnel. Breakdowns in the command net caused by enemy air attacks reduced the speed with which intelligence results were transmitted, but this difficulty was overcome by a pre-arranged plan which was put into effect all along the line from the unit furthest forward back to the communication intelligence control centre.

==== Close range radio intercept ====
After the initial landings, long-range intelligence at first produced only minor results. This was explained by the fact that the Allies did not wish to offer any clues to enemy radio intelligence and therefore restricted their radio communication. Moreover, the short distances within the beachhead areas probably permitted the issuance of verbal orders and reports. In addition, the enemy was able to use telephone connections, which were not disrupted by any Luftwaffe interference. The expansion or the beachheads resulted in the transmission of so many radio messages that a fairly clear picture of the enemy situation was speedily obtained. An even greater wealth of information was provided by short-range radio intelligence and divisional combat intelligence. The signal officer for OB West moved his short-range intelligence company to Seventh Army headquarters near Caen to improve short-range intelligence operations. The reports on the situation emanating from communication intelligence about fortyeight hours after the beginning of the invasion listed most of the enemy divisions and included data on the enemy army group then in command.

==== Theoretical second landing ====
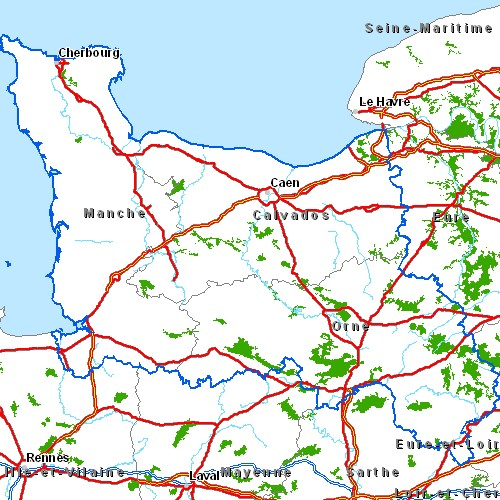
Map of the Operation Titanic area Seine-Maritime in the east, Manche in the west and Caen in the centre

The postwar press gave much attention to the opinion expressed by General Alfred Jodl, the Chief of the Armed Forces Operations Staff, who said that a second landing was expected north of the Seine and that therefore the German reserves and the Fifteenth Army stationed in that area were not immediately committed in a counterattack. The information obtained by communication intelligence did not support this assumption. The chief of the control centre of Communication Intelligence West was asked to express his personal opinion on this matter during a conference of the Western Intelligence Branch. He said that a comparison of the number of units already recognized with those previously identified in Great Britain permitted the conclusion that most of the Allied forces had already been landed and that the remaining ones were insufficient for a second landing. Any still uncommitted units would be needed to feed the current battle. This opinion was shared by the Western Intelligence Branch, but was in contradiction to that of the Armed Forces Operations Staff. The estimate of the situation was given some validity by the fact that a short time after the beginning of the invasion, a British landing craft had been captured near Boulogne. However, it seemed obvious that this enemy craft had lost its way.

When, during the first few days after the beginning of the invasion, the Allies created the impression of a second airborne landing by dropping dummy paratroops over Brittany at night (Operation Titanic), communication intelligence offered evidence to the contrary because of the complete absence of enemy radio traffic in the alleged landing area.

==== German High Command's lack of confidence ====
Not only in this instance but throughout the war, General Alfred Jodl, as well as Hitler himself, frequently displayed a lack or confidence in communication intelligence, especially if the reports were unfavorable. However, orders were issued as early as the time of the Salerno landing that all favourable reports should be given top priority and dispatched immediately, regardless of the time of day. Moreover, Communication Intelligence West was required to furnish a compilation of all reports unfavourable to the enemy derived from calls for help, casualty lists, and the like. When, during the first days of the invasion, American units in particular sent out messages containing high casualty figures, the OKW was duly impressed. In contrast, the estimate of the situation prepared by the Western Intelligence Branch was absolutely realistic and in no way coloured by optimistic hopes.

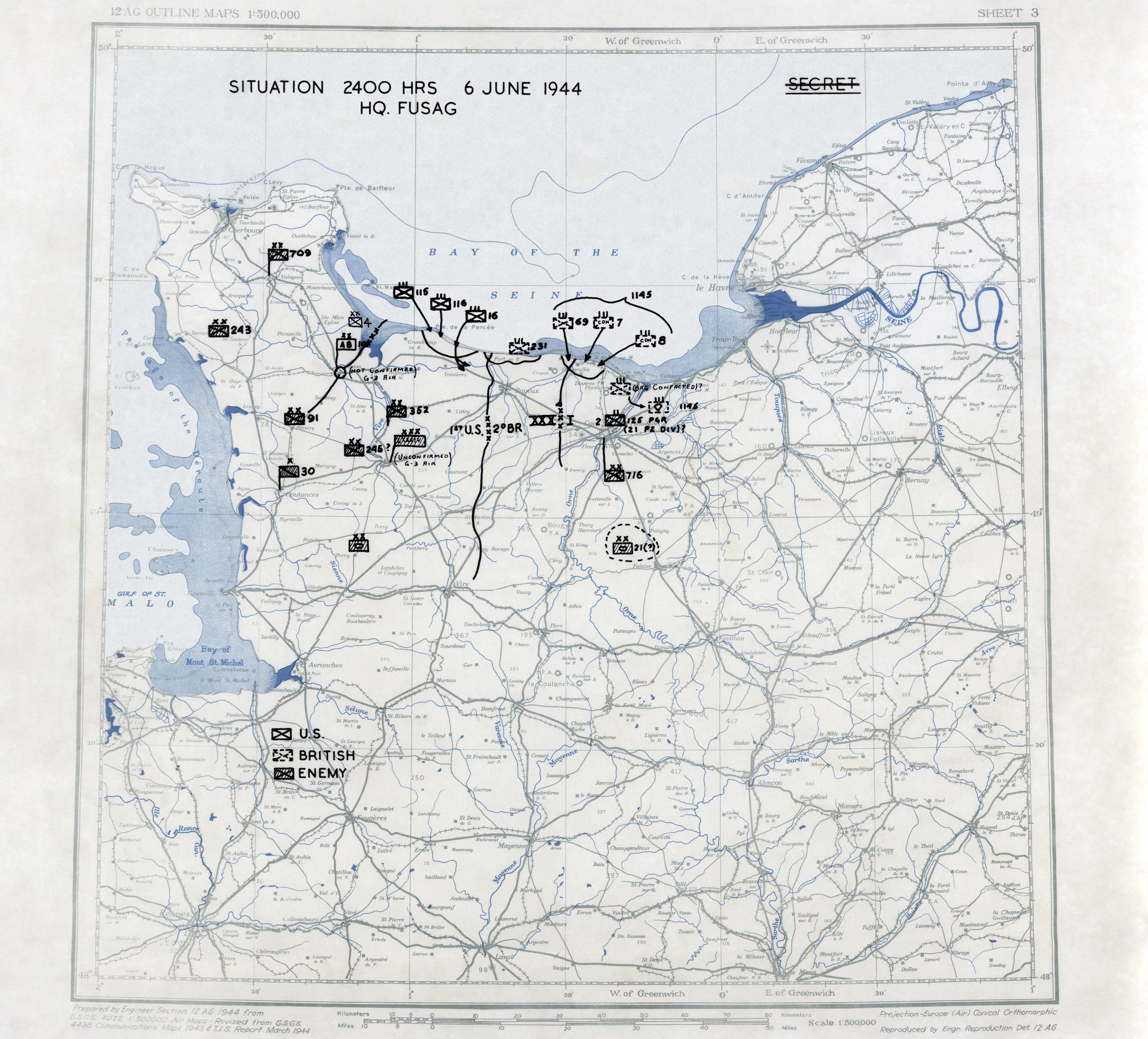
Situation map for 24:00, 6 June 1944

As already mentioned, short-range radio intelligence and combat intelligence provided such an abundance of information that even in Normandy any attack of division strength and greater could be predicted one to five days in advance. The American field cipher device was compromised. To be sure, messages enciphered by this system could at first be solved only after a delay of from two to four days. Later on, when more data had been gathered, only a few hours were needed. The British cryptographic service was unchanged: while the army was as efficient as ever, the RAF continued to be careless. there, as in Italy, communication intelligence maintained routine interception of the messages sent by air liaison officers attached to British Army headquarters, who thereby revealed the intentions of the allied command. There was no cryptographic co-operation between the Army and the RAF, nor was there any unified control in this field.

The following example shows how combat intelligence was carried out by the communication intelligence team of a division. Early in August 1944, west of Thury-Harcourt, the British 5th Armoured Division attacked in the sector of the German 277th Infantry Division, a unit which was commanded by General Albert Praun. The short-range radio intelligence team rendered excellent service.

A typical day of combat observation: In the early morning there was heavy ground fog and little fighting. At about 10:00 hours the weather cleared and several Allied reconnaissance planes appeared, which reported in the clear to the division air liaison officer all German movements in villages, in established positions, on roads, and at certain terrain features. The gridded map used by the British for reporting terrain features had previously fallen into German hands. In the German experience, British artillery would open fire on these objectives before launching the attack planned for that day. Commanders in the target areas were immediately warned of the expected artillery attack by telephone or motorcycle messenger. Twenty or 30 minutes after the air reconnaissance, the time required by the British artillery for preparation, concentrations of several hundred rounds each were delivered at a rapid rate of fire against the reported objectives. Similar warnings of artillery attacks could be issued through the broadcasting facilities. After this introduction to the combat activities of the day, the enemy tank crews began to chatter about their preparations, reconnaissance results, and attack objectives. As soon as the assembly areas or the British armour were recognized, the division artillery regiment concentrated its fire on these points. The allies usually reacted immediately with messages such as:

Fritz has seen us. Call off the attack for today and return to your initial assembly areas.

==== German radio psychosis during the invasion ====
The stupendous fire delivered by the Allied naval artillery in conjunction with the artillery of the divisions and corps in the beachhead, whose supply of ammunition seemed inexhaustible, as well as the effect of carpet bombing, created a "radio psychosis" among the German troops. They believed that every tap on the key or a field radio was being pinpointed by small army direction finders and that this was the reason for the allied fire. Consequently, German radio activity was discontinued. It took quite some time to persuade the troops that, in view of the large number of German transmitters employed at the front, enemy direction finding could not possibly be as effective as they feared and that the enemy fire, moreover, was equally heavy at all points.

It is remarkable that the comparatively weaker concentrations of fire delivered by Germans had the same psychological effect on allied troops, as was revealed by captured documents. The British troops, also, believed that all their radio emissions were being plotted by direction finders. Actually they were unaccustomed to the sudden concentrations of fire-in battalion or regimental strength which the Germans delivered without adjustment fire in order to prevent detection by flash and sound ranging instruments. Captured documents revealed that the British attempted to dispel this same apprehension on the part of their troops, which, from a technical standpoint, was unwarranted.

==== Early warning ====
As in the Italian theatre, the German divisions were grateful for the warning messages which immediately conveyed to them any relevant information obtained by radio intelligence. Later, quite a few German artillerymen would tell how this system saved their lives.

The Canadian, British, and American zones of action could be readily distinguished by the characteristics described earlier in this article. The plans for the Allied break-through at Avranches and details concerning the battle of the Falaise Pocket were known through radio intelligence.

When the communication intelligence units were forced to keep on the move during the later phase of the campaign, their own communication nets were jeopardized. Just as in the case of the command nets, disruptions were frequent, and the information obtained from radio intelligence sources decreased steadily. This was particularly true during the retreat of Army Group G following the Allied landings in southern France. In place of the communication intelligence unit previously stationed in that area, the German organisation in Italy covered the advance of the Allied forces from the south of France. Its reports were transmitted to OB West and to the Western Intelligence Branch. On several occasions Allied radio messages revealed that German units had been cut off by the Allied advance. In such instances immediate attempts ware made to re-establish contact with the encircled forces.

==== Differences in Allied communication security ====
In spite of low personnel strength and disrupted signal communication, German communication intelligence proved capable of covering the Allied forces advance to the Rhine by reporting the approximate composition and strength of the Allied units as well as the boundaries between forces of different nationalities. Battle-tested divisions were more careful in their radio operations than new ones. The Americans generally observed less radio discipline than the British, and thus provided a better source of information. During the first hours of the invasion both the Americans and the British often transmitted in the clear. The Canadians, who formed the numerically weakest landing contingent, supplied quantitatively, the least information. Among the American forces, Patton's army was the easiest to observe.

The US Seventh Army, advancing from northern France, offered the greatest difficulties, since it maintained exceptional radio discipline and cryptographic security. It could be plotted only by intensive D/F operations. This fact may perhaps be attributed to the Seventh Army's previous combat experience in Africa, Sicily, and Southern France, where its forces had learned to deal with German communication intelligence. In any event, the Seventh Army furnished an interesting example of a major command having trained its subordinate unit commanders and signal officers to observe such a high degree of radio discipline that the sources of enemy intelligence were restricted to a minimum.

Another American Army, possible the Third, could be easily observed, because its messages were transmitted in a careless manner and because it used very primitive ciphers below division level. In addition to revealing valuable tactical information, this army gave away its passwords to the Germans twenty-four hours in advance.

The reports, which many units transmitted at the same time every morning and evening from identical stations, facilitated the surveillance of intra-division communication between infantry, artillery and quartermaster units, and thus also between division and corps. The regular pattern of the communications also facilitated the solving of new ciphers soon after their application.

At that time messages enciphered with the small American cipher device could be easily solved, since many of these devices were in German hands, so that ten or twelve messages sufficed for a solution.

The Free French Army's movements could be observed without difficulty. Its radio system had hardly improved since 1940, not even with regard to the ciphers, which were easily solved. The gateway through which Philippe Leclerc de Hauteclocque division had entered Paris became known to Germany from an intercept even before the capital was actually occupied. The British airborne landings at Arnhem (Battle of Arnhem) impressed the Germans with the necessity of devoting more attention to the higher frequencies.

When the front lines were stabilized along the West Wall and the Vosges Mountains, five communication intelligence companies and several HQ units were withdrawn from the shortened Eastern Front and transferred to the East.(See Chart 8b)

==== Soviet Union's better ciphers ====
With the assistance of the previously employed units, the newly arrived ones soon became adjusted to operations in the western theatre. They proved especially useful in long-range interception to which they had been accustomed by years of experience in the Soviet Union. Their comparison of the two theatres was of great interest. They believed that intercepting, evaluating, and solving British and American radio messages presented fewer than those they had encountered in the Soviet Union. Their contention was that the Russians used better methods to render their traffic secure, sent fewer messages in plaintext, maintained radio discipline, and posed a greater problem to German direction finder units than their Western Allies.

=== Soviet Front 1941–1945 ===
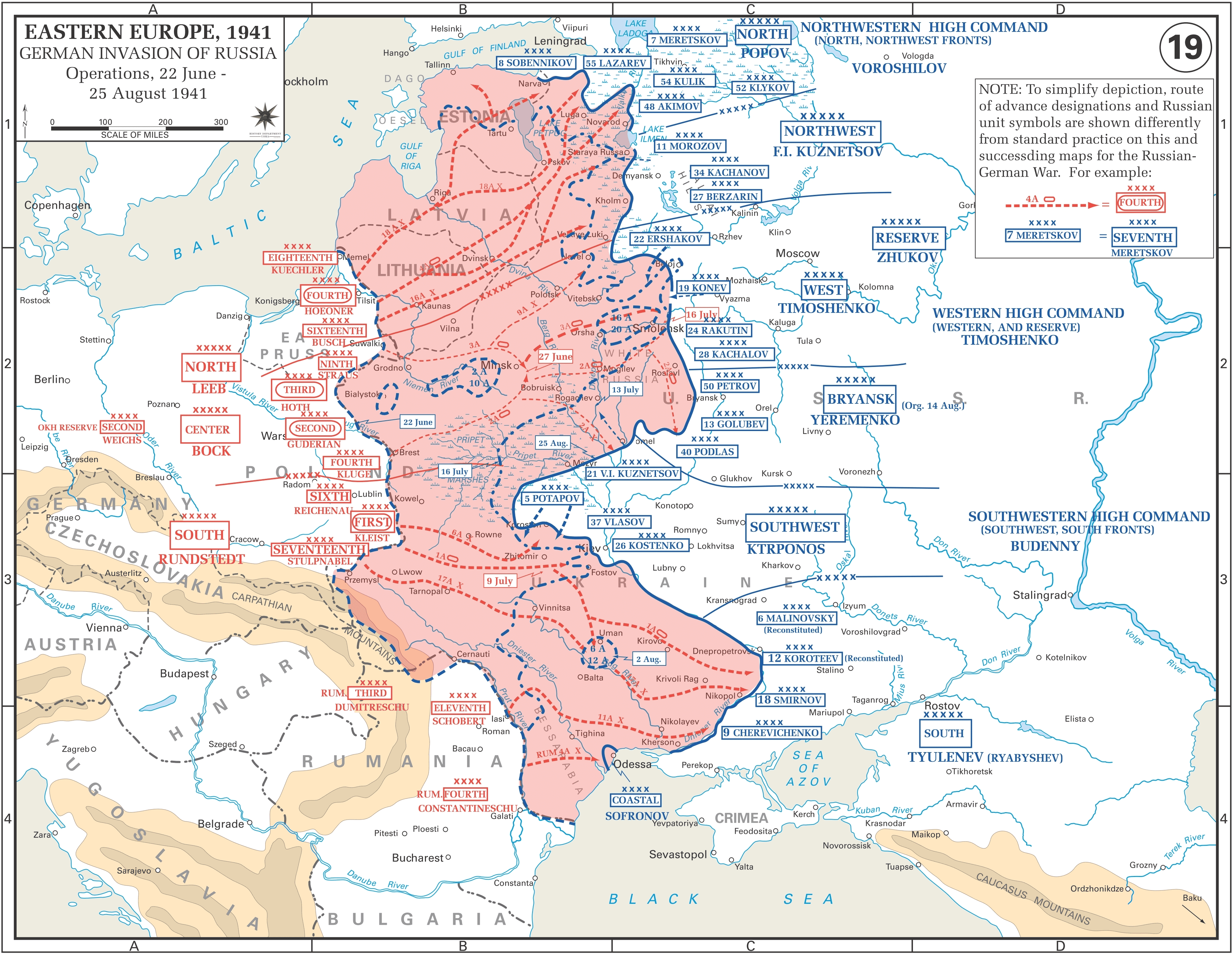
Opening phase of Operation Barbarossa

Chart 9. Armies, Direction finding and Intercept units movements during Signal intelligence operations by Germany in Southern Russian 1941–1942

The vastness of European Russia, its dearth of good roads, the great distances which had to be traversed, the lack of high-capacity long-distance commercial teletype circuits, as well as the shortage of military telephone apparatus and cables, compelled the Soviet Army to make a far greater use of radio communication than was necessary in the armies of the highly industrialized Western countries.

During 1941–42, German radio intelligence concentrated mainly on long range operations, which in spite of many difficulties provided the German command with important information about the Red Army.

With the conclusion of pre-war intelligence operations, the task of observing Soviet radio traffic was assigned to the Commander of Intercept Troops East stationed in Poznań. After the Polish Campaign he was put in charge of the three permanent intercept stations at Warsaw, Königsberg, and Breslau, and after the Campaign in the West, the 3rd, 7th, 9th, and 18th Intercept Companies were put at his disposal. He and all his intercept units were placed under Army Group B (subsequently Army Group Centre) when it took command of German forces in the East in July 1940

In May 1941, during the course of the military preparations against Russia, the eastern border of German-dominated territory was divided into three Army Group areas, designated North, Centre and South. The intercept units were placed under the command of the respective army groups in whose area they were stationed. The intelligence information obtained up to that time was turned over to the new commands.

According to instructions, the efforts of the intercept units were to be directed chiefly at ascertaining the organisation and distribution of forces of the Soviet Army and Air Force in European Russia, west of the Ural Mountains. The missions of this intelligence unit was to be as follows:

1. Analysis of operating techniques. This phase was to provide precise information on current radio techniques, which were not substantially different from those used before 1939.
2. Analysis of network structure. This was to reveal the relationship between the command nets of the military districts and their occasional overlapping with the nets used by the corps in the fields. In addition, it was to furnish especially important information on the organisation of corps and division nets, some of which had been revealed when the Soviet Union occupied Bessarabia.
3. Cryptanalysis. This phase was to deal with the solution of all field ciphers which were encountered (chiefly groups of two or three numbers) and with methods for solving higher-echelon ciphers (generally groups of five numbers or letters). On the basis of the cryptanalyzed material an extensive card index was compiled on personnel and unit designations.
4. Final evaluation. This operation was to be concerned with the top-level organisation of the Soviet Armed Forces, Army, and Air Force.

As a result of the interception of air force ground communications, detailed information was available on the structure and strength of the Soviet Air Force. Information was obtained, for example, about types of aircraft, armament, and equipment. With regard to the structure of the Army, however, the status of its reorganisation, the distribution of its forces, and its preparations for border defence, the intelligence picture was quite incomplete.

Intercept coverage of Asiatic Russia produced rather meager results and the more distant parts of the armament production area could not be covered at all.

==== Great distances ====
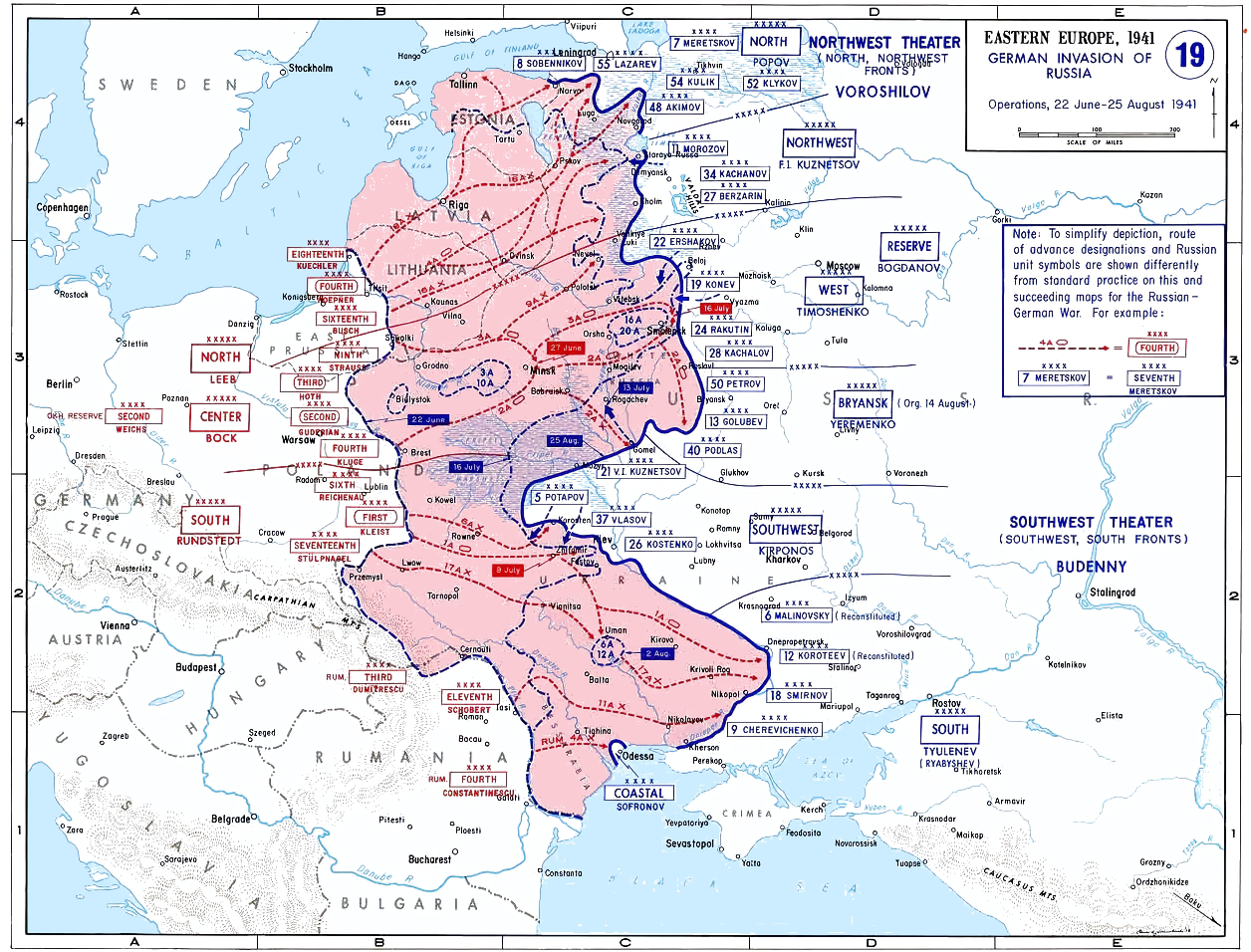
German advances from June to August 1941

The intercept equipment then available to the Germans was no match for the great distances involved. Lack of information about the Soviet border defense forces stemmed not only from the reduced volume of Russian radio traffic, made possible by extensive land lines, but to an even larger extent from the lack of short range radio intelligence. Moreover, the German intercept units stationed near the western borders of the USSR from the Baltic to the Black Sea could not reach far into the interior of the Soviet Union. Long-range direction-finding operations with shortwave equipment were not effective until 1942.

The picture of the enemy situation on radio intelligence differed substantially from information gathered from other sources. This was especially true of intelligence pertaining to the Soviet Air Force. Lack of information on the Soviet Army did not, however, lead German communication intelligence to make the dangerous mistake of underestimating the Soviet strength.

The following narrative refers exclusively to radio intelligence operations carried out in the area of Army Group South, commanded by Field Marshal Gerd von Rundstedt from June 1941 to November 1942. Because of the lack of records. it is impossible to set down an exhaustive survey of this period. However, an estimate of Soviet Army radio traffic will be attempted by describing a few special missions undertaken by German radio intelligence on this front. In this connection it will be necessary to refer to the operations of the three intercept companies employed in this area. (See Chart 9)

When the German invasion began, the following intercept units were operating in the area of Army Group South:

- 7th Intercept Company. Located on the Pruth, facing east, operating on a base line from Galați to Iași. Its mission was radio intelligence in the path of the Eleventh Army.
- 3rd Intercept Company. Located on the eastern border of occupied Poland, facing southeast between Rzeszów and Vlodavka on the Bug. It was responsible for intelligence ahead of the Seventeenth and Sixth Armies.
- 57th Intercept Company was en route from the Balkans. It arrived in Rzeszów on 28 June after the start of hostilities and first had to be reorganised and to become oriented to the intercepting of Russian radio traffic. Thus, it was not completely ready to go into operation until July. It was then ordered to carry·out radio intelligence missions in the path of the Sixth Army, thus releasing the 3rd Intercept Company to the Seventeenth army.

These companies had insufficient personnel and equipment for the task of covering the large areas assigned to those armies. The command responsible for these allocations had been informed of this discrepancy before the missions were assigned.

On 2 June 1941, therefore, Army Group South ordered intercept operations to be restricted to a zone of action bounded in the north by the Pinsk Marshes and extending as far east as the Dnieper River. This would include only that traffic emanating from the Odessa and Kiev military districts. For the time being OKH refrained from assigning any radio intercept missions which were more far-reaching than this.

==== First day of Operation Barbarossa ====
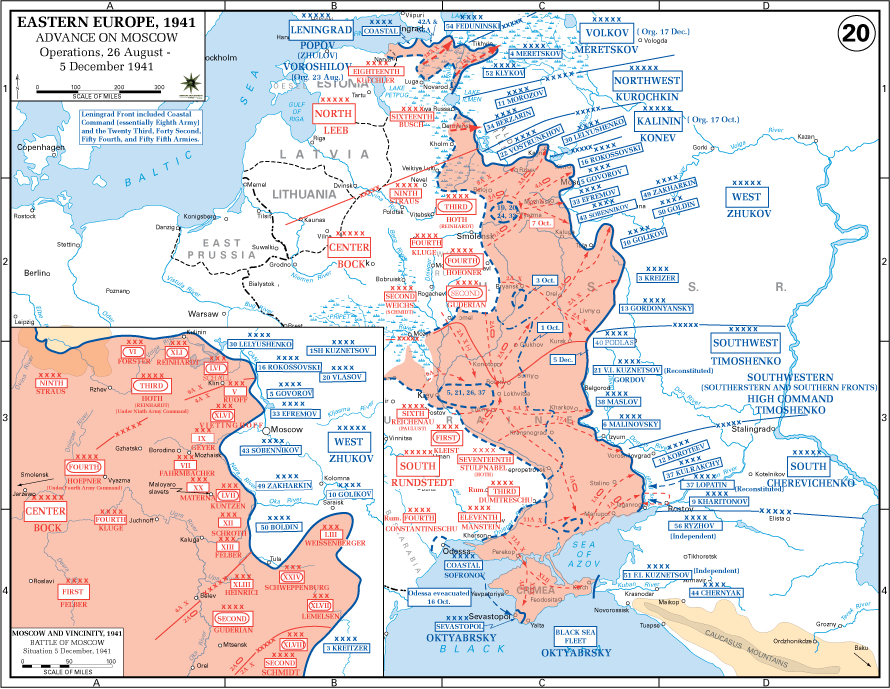
German advance on Moscow from 26 August to 5 December 1941 - The German offensives during Operation Typhoon.

On 22 June 1941, immediately after the German Army had made contact with the Soviet force, the latter lifted all radio restrictions. The volume of messages rose so sharply that it was reasonable to conclude that the Russians had been taken completely by surprise, if not by the attack itself, then at least with respect to its timing. Long encrypted messages alternated with dispatches sent in the clear. These made it possible to sketch the rough outline of the radio picture, especially in front of the Seventeenth and Sixth Armies. The Germans could then draw conclusions, though at first unreliable, about the number of Russian divisions opposing them and could identify the numerical designations of corps and divisions. Since the Russians continued to use codes and ciphers which had already been broken, some of their messages could be crypanalyzed at once. The more difficult systems did, however, provide sufficient text for new attempts at a solution, which were begun immediately.

The first German impression of Russian traffic was that, when suddenly surprised by a difficult situation, the Soviets were unable to maintain adequate radio security, although this became even more necessary than before.

On the second day of hostilities, signals were intercepted whose points of origin were plotted east of Lviv. The interpretation of this radio activity was of great significance to the German command. At first, the signals consisted exclusively of emissions resulting from tuning adjustments. The Russians used frequencies outside the range of any radio set on which German signal intelligence had definite knowledge as of that time. The intercept team detailed to investigate these signals picked up a number of poorly disguised designations, such as "TK" (tank korpus). The name of a certain lieutenant colonel of the armoured forces was mentioned. In addition, brief check-calls were made by subordinate stations, all of which indicated the assembly of a mechanized force probably consisting of three divisional units, two of which were armoured and appeared to be of the same type, judging from the characteristics of their radio traffic. This interpretation was adhered to, although it was doubted by the German command, which considered it improbable that mixed motorized rifle and tank brigades hitherto recognised had been reorganised so suddenly into regular-type armoured divisions and were coupled with a motorized rifle division to form a triangular corps. The interpretation suggested by radio intelligence was confirmed, however, in the course of the engagements that commenced in the Lviv area immediately after this information had been intercepted.

In the course of the campaign, Russian tank units frequently gave themselves away by faulty radio communication before beginning to attack. German intercept personnel pounced on the especially careless requests for fuel which were radioed by Soviet tank units. Not until the middle of 1942 did Germany find it more difficult to intercept them.

In the path of the 11th Army the presence and intentions of a strong enemy force assembled near Bilhorod-Dnistrovskyi in southern Bessarabia were accurately reported, a success which, in this case, was due exclusively to effective cryptanalysis.

The newly arrived 7th Intercept Company quickly changed over from observing Yugoslav and Greek traffic to the interception of Russian communications. Its mission was to observe the Russian defensive build-up west of Kiev in July 1941. Chiefly by means of direction finding it followed the gradual withdrawal of these forces across the Dnieper River. Then, for the first time, it became impossible to solve messages handled by corps and division nets, because the enemy had finally changed all his cryptographic systems.

==== Soviet 12th Army strength revealed ====
By concentrating both intercept companies in the Kasatkin-Delaya Tserkov-Uman area in the path of the German 17th and 6th Armies, the strength of the Russian 12th Army in particular was revealed by its radio communications as well as by the direction-finding operations focussed on it. There was an especially high yield of clear-text messages during the Battle of Uman pocket in mid August 1941. The utter confusion on the part of the Russian radio nets, which was reminiscent of the traffic intercepted at the end of the Campaign in the West, spelled an impending collapse.

Captured documents not only confirmed the results obtained by radio intelligence evaluations but also provided valuable supplementary information for traffic analysis and message evaluation procedures. Captured radio equipment provided additional information about the frequencies used by the Russians, and the cryptographic material which had fallen into German hands facilitated the work of the intercept control centre in solving the difficult Russian codes. Quite revealing was the interrogation of Colonel Karmin, the captured commander of signal troops of the Russian Twelfth Army. The RI results obtained during the two months prior to his capture, which were discussed with him, indicated that Russian radio traffic was very vulnerable to German interception because of its rigid operating procedure, the failure to change call signs and frequencies at frequent irregular intervals, and, especially, the gradual deterioration of their radio discipline. A previously made observation was confirmed, namely, that the not too intelligent Russian radio operators at division level and below could handle only simple ciphers. On the other hand, the complicated systems used by the intermediate and high command echelons, which were handled by special cryptographic staff officers, were reasonably secure. In spite of this German strategic long-range radio intelligence was successful, because it devoted more attention to traffic analysis when message evaluation failed to produce results. On the other hand, the Germans rarely used tactical short-range intelligence, for which there is generally little occasion during rapid advance movements.

==== Capture of Kiev ====
When the Germans captured Kiev, the Russians surprised them by the use of radio-controlled mines, which were actuated by tone-modulated carrier waves. The intercept personnel, being fully occupied with their regular intelligence missions, did not recognize these impulse transmissions. They were first identified by radio operators of the German 6th army. A special intercept platoon was attached to that army to observe these signals, so that means might be devised for jamming the frequencies used. Jamming transmitters were taken from the corps signal battalions and turned over to the special intercept platoon. After many days of unsuccessful attempts they finally succeeded in neutralizing the detonating impulses. The discovery of these impulse emissions led to the suggestion that a special unit be organised to intercept them in order to protect the troops against this kind o£ weapons. OKH was unable, however, to adopt this suggestion because of the shortage of intercept personnel and equipment.

==== Reaching the Dnieper River ====
After reaching the Dnieper, the three intercept companies were stationed side by side along the base lines Kiev-Cherkasy, Oherkassy-Dnepropetrovsk and Dnepropetrovsk-Nikolayev; advance intercept stations were moved up to the bridgeheads at Kiev, Kremenchuk, and Zaporizhia. On 15 September 1941 the army group assigned these units a new intelligence mission, which comprised the area embraced by the line Kiev-Voronezh-Rostov-Kherson with the main effort directed at the Donets Basin. Included also were the Crimea and the Kuban area on the southern flank. It was urgently necessary to find out whether and how the enemy was organising his defenses east of the Dnieper, whether reserves were being brought up, and what changes had taken place in the command structure. Moreover, the radio traffic of the Black Sea Fleet was to be observed. OKH supplemented this mission by ordering very-long-range intelligence operations against the western and southern regions of the Caucasus adjacent to Turkey and Iran. Certain newspapers accounts stated that, between late August and mid October, OKH had clearly recognized the administrative nets of four Soviet armies which were in the process of activation in the area east of Moscow. Those reports appear to have been exaggerated. In any case, findings such as these were not brought to the attention of the Group South at that time.

Then on 2 October 1941, the German attack from the Dnieper bridgeheads was resumed, the Sixth Army was advancing toward Kharkiv, the Seventeenth Army was moving in the direction of the Donets Basin, and the Eleventh Army was turning southward from the Lower Dnieper toward the Crimea. At the same time Panzergruppe Kleist—later the 1st Panzer Army—was advancing on Rostov. All the while, the area under intercept observation became so much larger, that the 7th Intercept Company had to be reinforced and divided into three units, so that it could cover the Crimea and the Donets area, as well as carry out the OKH order for very long range reconnaissance. This measure was an emergency solution characterized by all the deficiencies inherent in improvisation. The Army Group South area could no longer be covered adequately. The Army Group's request that a fourth intercept company be assigned to the 1st Panzer Army was not granted.

As a result of the new intercept operations, which had been initiated from the west bank of the Dnieper, the impression soon arose that the enemy radio traffic was becoming steadier, a symptom which obviously pointed to a reorganisation, and presumably to a stiffening of Soviet resistance. The chief characteristics of the apparent reorganisation were the absence of any corps headquarters, as suggested by the direct radio links between army and division headquarters, and appearance of "fronts", 11 which corresponded to the German army groups.

==== Reaching the Donets and Mius Rivers ====
During October 1941 the Sixth and Seventeenth Armies and the 1st Panzer Army reached the Donets and the Mius Rivers and took Kharkov and Rostov. For the purpose of covering the extensive Kharkov area, where the most stubborn resistance was encountered, the 57th Intercept Company was retained at army group headquarters in Poltava and its D/F teams were assigned the area between Lozova and Sumy. The 3rd Intercept Company was moved up to Slavyansk, where it carried out its direction-finding operations on a line from Mariupol on the Sea of Azov to a point west of Izium on the Donets. Coverage of the enemy area as far east as the Don river between Voronezh and Rostov was thus reasonably assured. The 7th Intercept Company, operating with the Eleventh Army against the Crimea on the base line Kherson-Osipenko (subsequently Simferopol–Osipenko), continued to assist in observing the Rostov area, insofar as its mission against the Crimea and the Kuban area permitted.

During the German advance from the Dnieper to the Donets a reliable picture of the composition of the Soviet forces on the forward part of the army group front was produced from an evaluation of the Soviet radio traffic, which had once again been revived.

==== Limits to radio activity and tapping Soviet telephones ====
The Soviets now began to limit their radio activity to that of the advance command nets. In order not to lose contact with further developments, and in the expectation that Soviet radio operators would not maintain their customary discipline, the German divisions were emphatically instructed to intensify the activity of their short-range intelligence platoons. The 3rd Intercept Company stationed in Sloviansk was ordered to employ all personnel who could possibly be spared from long-range intelligence operations for use in tactical short-range intelligence. For all practical purposes this company took over the direction of short-range radio intelligence in co-operation with the short-range intelligence platoons of the divisions on the Donets front. The German intelligence analysts now built up the enemy radio picture from front to rear, instead of from rear to front, as formerly happened. After the translator problem had been more or less solved, this unusual procedure brought good results, since far-reaching conclusions could be drawn from the generally insecure phone traffic of the Soviets.

==== Mid November 1941 ====
Up to the middle of November 1941, there were two distinct focal points against which the 57th Intercept Company was ordered to direct its long-range in intelligence operations, namely the area embraced by the line Kharkiv-Belgorod-Valukhi-Izium, as well as that east and southeast of Rostov. Whereas it was impossible at first to obtain any reliable information about that former area, radio nets were recognized in the latter area which, being tightly organised, enabled the Germans to ascertain the assembly of several divisions. The radio picture thus gained, however, did not correspond in any way with reports from other sources, according to which only weak forces were stationed near Rostov, which even the enemy contemptuously referred to as a (Russian: golaye armiya) (stripped or naked army). It seemed peculiar that cryptanalyzed intercepts should mention the numbers of divisions which had been destroyed in the previous fighting. Their reactivation under previous designations was doubted by the German command until it was confirmed in combat.

==== Armaments factory communications net discovered ====
About the same time, the sky wave emissions of a radio net operating on the short wavelengths were picked up. This net apparently did not maintain close contact with military headquarters but seemed to operate essentially between armament factories. Its plaintext messages mentioned division designations in the 400 series and above of which there was no previous record. At first, the Oberkommando des Heeres considered this a Soviet deception plan, since it believed that such large-scale activations were unlikely, reckoning on the assumption that from every million population one could form but two divisions at full wartime strength. Since European Russia had a population of some 160 million and Asiatic Russia, about 30 million, no more than 380 divisions, therefore, could be activated. Some 330 divisions (260 rifle and motorized rifle, 50 tank, and 20 cavalry divisions) had already been engaged by the Germans. It could be as assumed that there were 40 divisions behind the front and 20 divisions in the Far East and Caucasus. However, the existence of divisions bearing designations in the 400 series was actually confirmed later in the campaign.

==== Late November 1941 ====
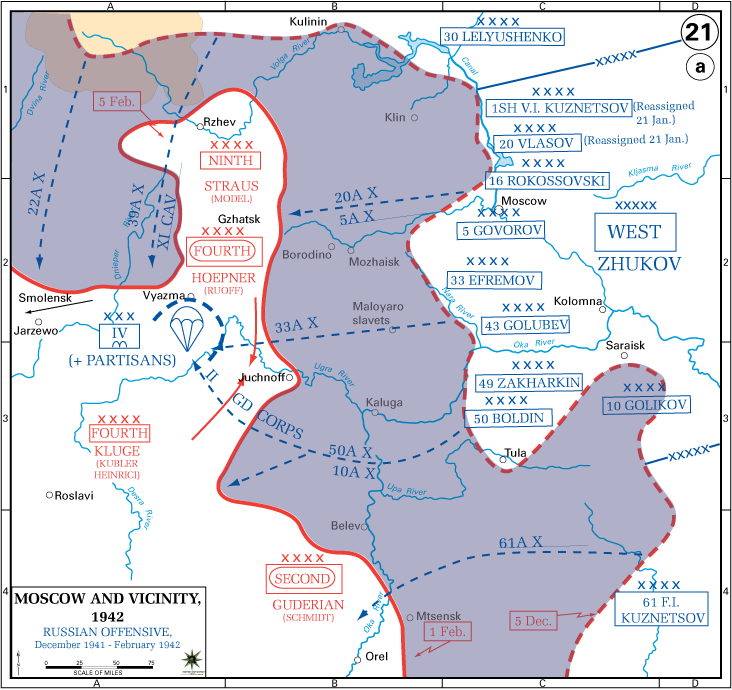
Moscow and Vicinity 1942, Russian Offensive December 1941 – February 1942

In late November 1941, traffic in the Rostov net indicated that there were 10 stations in the net. Even though one could not be sure that 10 full divisions were involved, since some of the intra-net relationships were not at all clear, it was nevertheless evident that a troop concentration was under way such as had not been seen for quite some time on the Eastern Front. It was, therefore, reasonable to conclude that a Soviet attack was imminent. At the same time new traffic was heard from the vicinity of Yeysk on the Sea of Azov. However, after careful surveillance, this traffic was interpreted as a deception measure because of its incoherence. On 28 November 1941, the Soviets attacked Rostov, after Army Group South had ordered its evacuation and the withdrawal behind the Muis of the southern wing of the 1st Panzer Army.

Because of the great distances, ranging from 500 to 600 miles, radio intelligence against Transcaucasia and the Black Sea Fleet failed to produce satisfactory results. In any case, the interception of short-wave training transmissions from the Tbilisi military district revealed the presence of additional reserves in this area. Moreover, staff were detected in both Tbilisi and Kutaisi. On the other hand, coverage of Allied traffic originating in or near Iranian territory was incomplete. Coverage of British traffic originating in Iran was especially fragmentary.

It was impossible to detect in time the Russian preparations for an attack on the eastern Crimea, which was carried out in conjunction with a landing in Feodosia.

At the end of the first year of the war, it was clear that the Soviets had made progress in their transmission security and had begun to correct the defects which had developed during the first engagements.

==== January 1942 ====
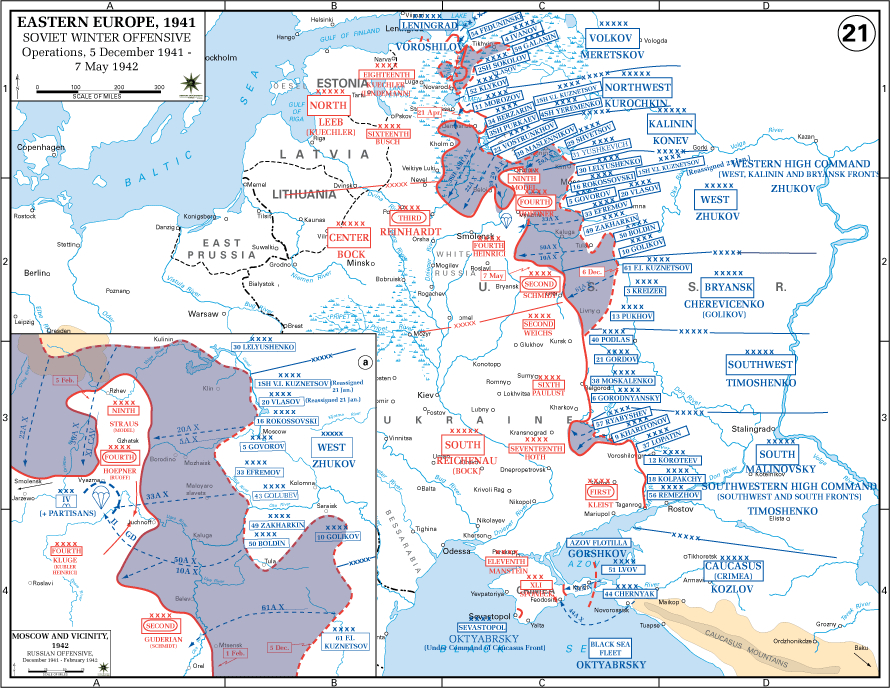
Soviet Winter Offensive 6 December – 7 May 1942

In January 1942, OKH ordered the commanders of intercept units attached to army groups to effect deceptive measures by commencing large-scale radio transmission along the entire front. However, before results could be expected, the Allies attacked south of Kharkiv, between Sloviansk and Balakliia. Here, in contrast to the situation around Rostov, German radio intelligence could not direct the Soviet attack because of its failure to detect the assembly of enemy forces. Heavier Russian radio traffic during the penetration which the Germans halted near Lozova once again supplied tho intercept service with the material necessary to the fulfillment of its mission, despite the fact that the 3rd Intercept Company committed near Sloviansk had been inoperative for a fairly long period or time. Since this company had to be utilized as a combat unit, it was forced to discontinue its intercept operations. As soon as the immediate danger was over, the company was pulled back to Donetsk (Stalio), where it resumed its intercept operations.

Immediately after the enemy penetration was sealed off, Russian radio traffic decreased and was characterized by the same high degree of security which prevailed before the attack. However, the Germans noticed with surprise that this activity was restricted to the general area around Kharkiv. Consequently, the short-range intelligence units were once more brought to maximum strength within the means available. The belated reorganisation of the German intercept service into separate long-range and short-range RI units—the latter by assembling the short-range intelligence platoons of the divisions into companies which were subordinate to the communication intelligence commanders at army group headquarters, gradually got under way. By performing a laborious and piecemeal job, the German intercept units eventually succeeded in plotting three enemy forces north and south or Kharkiv near Volchansk, ten to fifteen rifle divisions, three cavalry divisions, and five tank brigades; in the Lozova-Balakliia area, ten rifle divisions, more than five cavalry divisions, and at least ten tank brigades, presumably under the command of General Ivan Konev; near Sloviansk, five additional mechanized units, apparently reserves, whose individual strength could not be ascertained. In view of the disproportionately large number of mobile forces consisting of tank brigades and cavalry divisions, a new Soviet attack on both sides of Kharkiv (Kharkov) was to be expected. Two clues were available for predicting the timing of the attack or whether its objective was to be limited in scope. Throughout this period the Soviets maintained relatively strict radio discipline. This may be said of the Soviet attack east of Volchansk, the attack from the Izyum salient south of Kharkov, which commenced on 12 May 1942, the German counterattacks from the Sloviansk–Darvinovka line northward to Balakliia, during which enemy forces west of the Donets were encircled and destroyed, and the elimination of the Russian penetration near Volchansk.

==== End of fighting in Crimea ====
Russian radio traffic during the final stage or the fighting in the Crimea was far less disciplined. After the Germans had occupied the peninsula with the exception of Sevastopol, which was no longer of interest from a long-range intelligence point of view, the 7th Intercept Company was moved north in early June 1942 in order to increase the coverage or the Kharkov area. Abandoning its long and medium wave direction-finding operations for the time being, the company was employed for intercept purposes only, after experiments had shown that reception of short-wave signals from the Kuban and Caucasus areas was more favourable, or at least of equal quality, at a greater distance from the objective. The 3rd Intercept Company stationed at Donetsk was given the task of covering the area east or the lower Don.

==== July 1942 ====
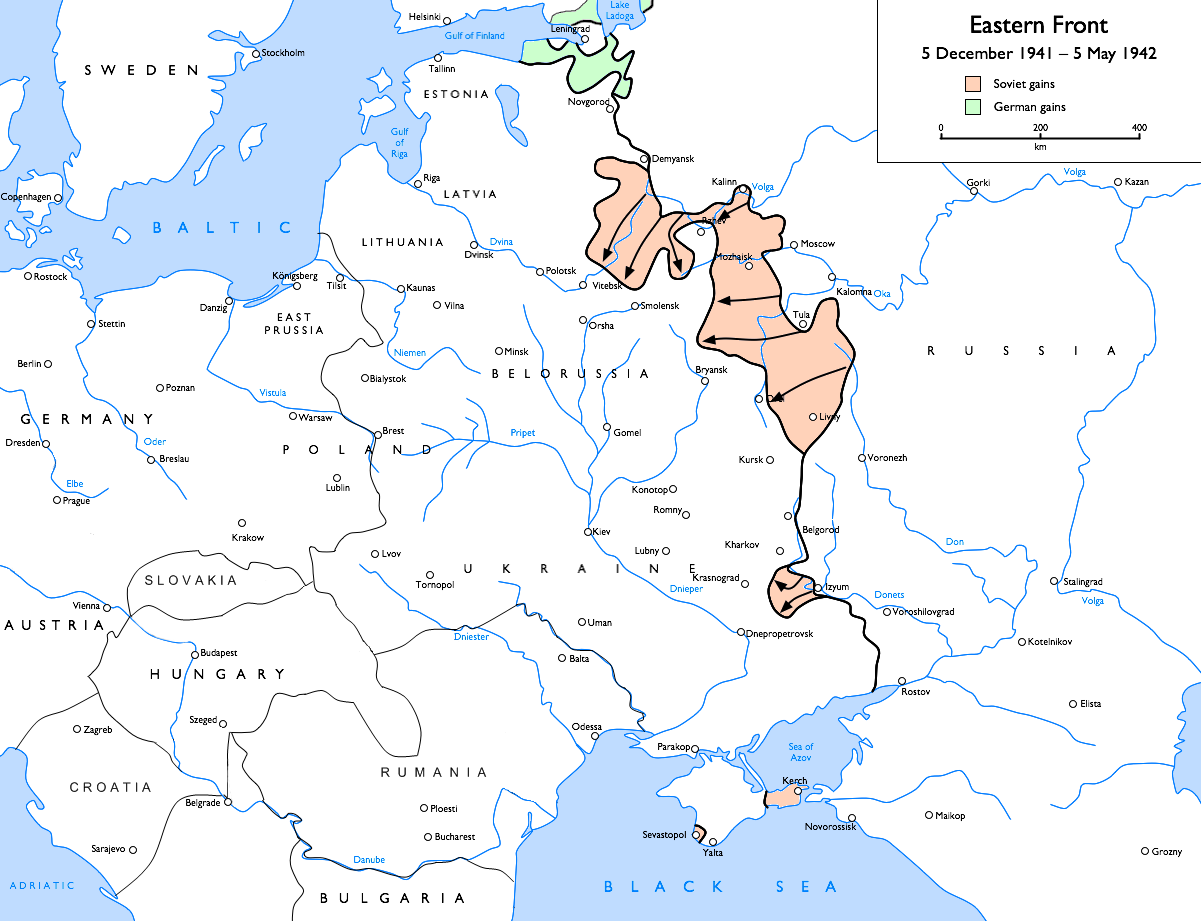
Map of the Eastern Front, 5 May 1941 to 5 May 1942

Radio intelligence produced hardly any results during the German attack (Eastern Front, Don, Volga, and Caucasus: Summer 1942) across the Donets in July 1942, the objective or which was to reach the Don between Rostov and Voronezh. The Russian divisions appeared to be withdrawing, during the course of which movement radio silence was maintained. At that time it was not even possible to identify the stations in the higher-echelon command belt, the observation of which had always yielded good results. Soviet radio traffic on the northern Don front seemed to be under the supervision of a particularly capable individual.

The Sixth Army was making preparations for an offensive against the corridor between the Don and Volga River in the direction of Stalingrad (Volgograd), while the 17th Army was pulled out of the front and assigned to the newly arrived headquarters of Army Group A under Field Marshal Wilhelm List. This army group was supposed to seize the Caucasus. That zone of the Don front which had previously been held by the 17th Army, was taken over by the Hungarian Second Army in the north, the Italian 8th Army in the centre, and the Romanian Third Army in the south. The three mentioned armies had weak long-range Radio Intercept units, whose efficiency varied. The Hungarians were capable of performing limited independent missions, whereas the Romanians could not be entrusted with any such missions.

The Romanian 4th Army adjacent to the right wing of the German 6th Army had no communication intelligence unit whatever. The Hungarians, Italians, and Romanians were unfamiliar with short-range operations and lacked any understanding of inter-army co-operation in the pursuit of radio intelligence missions. The Italians were inclined to theorize about radio intelligence results instead of subjecting them to careful analysis. Characteristic of their methods was that they made it a practice to use Soviet prisoners of war as radio intercept operators.

To achieve greater security the 57th Long-Range RI Company was stationed behind the Hungarian and Italian Armies in Novy Oskol, with a D/F base line along the upper Don. The 3rd Long-Range RI Company was moved up to the vicinity of Kamianske (Kamenskaya) and ordered to cover the area in the path of the German 6th Army and the Romanian Fourth and Third Armies. The 7th Long-Range RI Company was moved close to the new headquarters of Army Group South in Starobilsk. Its mission was to cover either the northern or the southern zone of advance, according to how the enemy radio picture developed. As the result of repeated requests, the 26th Long-Range RI Company, which had so far been held at the disposal of OKH finally arrived at Mariupol and Taganrog, from where it was to cover the Kuban and Caucasus areas exclusively. The newly organised short-range companies were committed in the German 6th Army sector.

The new mission was in accordance with the orders issued in July and August 1942 by the two army group headquarters, which did not limit the depth of the intercept area. As soon as Army Group A assumed command in the south, the Commander of Communications Intelligence (six) was to take charge of the 3rd and 26th Long-Range Companies, as well as of the short-range RI company of the 17th Army.

==== August 1942 ====
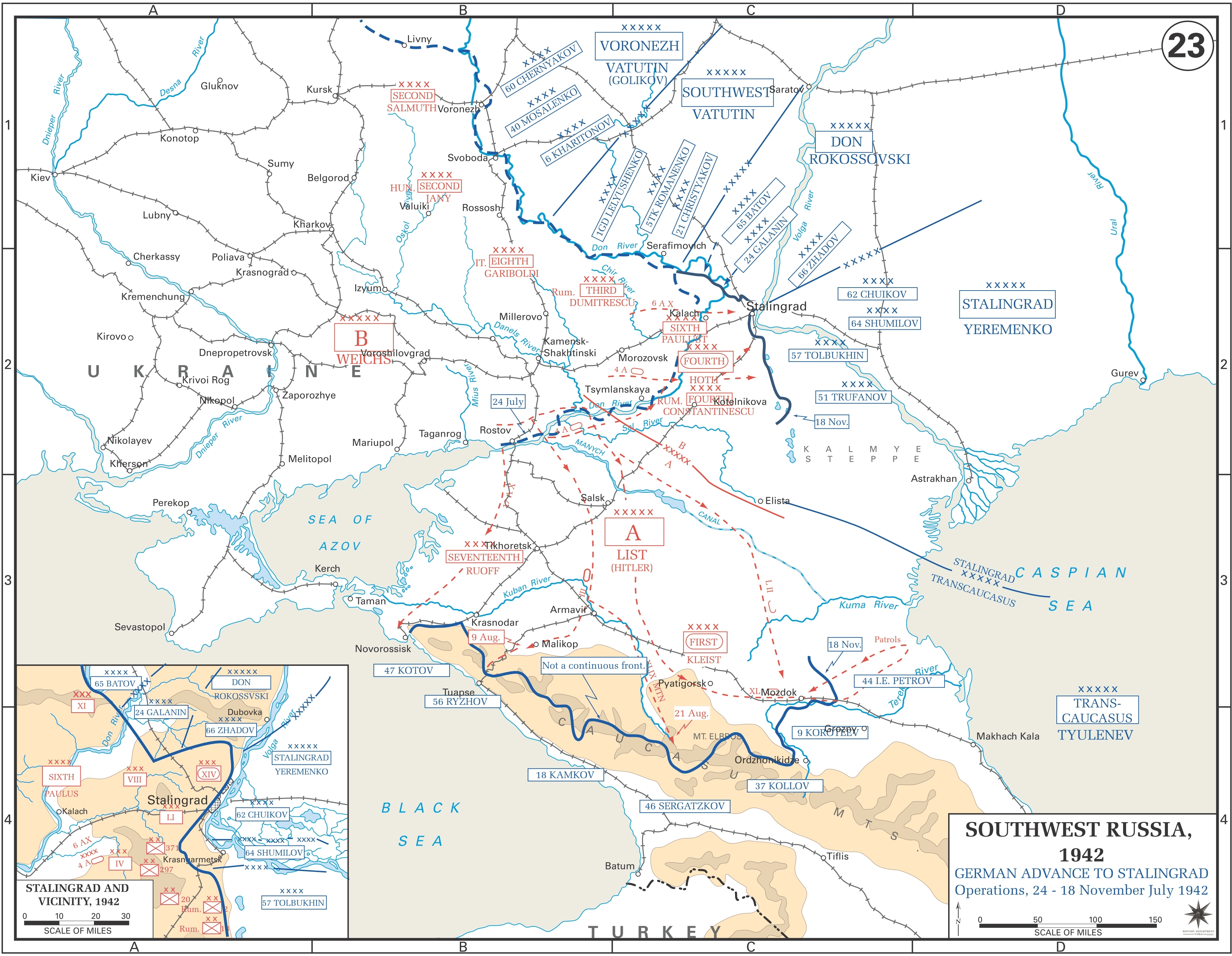
German summer offensive on Stalingrad July 1942 – November 1942

During August, the solution of a large number of the Soviet cryptographic systems enabled the Germans to plot the disposition of the Russian divisions defending the east bank of the Don between the mouth of the Khopyor River and Voronezh. By mid September, chiefly through short-range intelligence results, the Germans were aware of the disposition of Russian forces on the newly formed Stalingrad front along the Don River-Volga River Corridor. After reaching Volgograd (Stalingrad) the Germans were familiar with most of the Soviet divisions defending the east bank of the Volga River. In view of past experience, such comprehensive results had not been expected. The explanation for this was given by a Russian radio message, which stated that the radio restrictions which the enemy had intended to impose could not be maintained because of the shortage of wire communication facilities. For the same reason, the Russians seemed to be compelled to transmit estimates of the enemy situation by radio. These estimates indicated that they had accurately gauged the weakness of the Romanian and Italian Armies and the vulnerability of the boundaries between them.

==== October 1942 ====
In October 1942 the Germans uncovered the formation of a strong Soviet (Russian) force on both banks of the Khopyor River. According to a garbled intercept, the far-reaching strategic objective of this force was Rostov. On 19 November 1942 the Soviets began to attack across the Don.

Equally timely was the interpretation from traffic analysis of the movements which in mid November, led to the encirclement of the German 6th Army At that time the communication intelligence commander submitted a detailed report summarizing his observations to army group headquarters, where it was approved and forwarded via OKH to Oberkommando der Wehrmacht. The contents of this report revealed the threatening development in all its ramifications. The report, which was lost at the end of the war, attributed the deterioration of Soviet radio security primarily to their growing feeling of absolute superiority.

==== Analysis of difficulties of radio intelligence in the Soviet Union ====
From the beginning of the Russian campaign until the reverse at Volgograd (Stalingrad) in 1942–43, German radio intelligence operations against Russian communications was carried out under the most difficult circumstances. As already mentioned, the personnel and equipment available were entirely disproportionate to the magnitude of the intercept mission. It was impossible to cover the target area either in depth with barely a hundred receivers, or laterally with three long-medium wave D/F base lines and one short-wave long-range D/F base line. Inadequate intercept communication facilities, which were not improved until late 1942 when the communication intelligence commanders were supplied with their own circuits, made it difficult to co-ordinate intelligence activities and to exchange solutions among individual units. The vastness of European Russia, the indescribably difficult terrain conditions, especially after the beginning of the muddy season (Rasputitsa), and finally the unusually low temperatures, which occasionally halted the work of the D/F teams, interfered with the efficiency of operations. If the Germans were able to obtain comprehensive results, this is to be attributed to systematic coverage which always emphasized selection of only the most important targets and to the relatively low level of Russian transmission security. In view of the vastness of their country and the inadequacy of their land lines, the Russians, more than any other nation, were forced to rely on radio communication. Logically, this fact should have induced them to be especially painstaking in maintaining security. They attempted to achieve security exclusively by safeguarding the cryptosystems used in their higher-echelon traffic, some of which were solved despite the fact that they caused considerable difficulties. On the other hand, the Russians neglected to make their field ciphers equally foolproof against cryptanalysis. This was the reason why the German intercept service could continue to produce results during the Kharkiv operations when the results obtained from observing Soviet command nets fell to a very low level. In this connection it should be remembered that because of its many dialects, the Russian language imparts a degree of security to plaintext messages which only outstanding translators can overcome. Such translation experts are equally indispensable for successful cryptanalysis, for which a complete command of the language is an absolute requisite. The evolution of Russian radio traffic during the period under review proves that the military leadership was endeavoring to improve the security of its radio communication. This was accomplished chiefly by imposing radio silence or at least by restricting the use of radio communication. Actually, these orders were rarely obeyed in a consistent manner. It is in keeping with the mentality of the Russians that they are more successful in restraining the urge to indulge in unnecessary chatter during troop concentrations and assemblies, defensive actions, and withdrawals than during attacks which promise success, and during advances. Their ability to use electrical and mechanical devices to attain a high degree of transmission security should not be underestimated. However, it required quite some time before the Soviet field radio operators became adjusted to such complicated innovations.

A certain awkwardness characterized Soviet radio operations and will probably be difficult for them to overcome. It is precisely this awkwardness which constitutes the greatest danger to the secrecy of wartime radio communications. For this reason the interception of Soviet radio communications will probably always be rewarding.

==== Analysis of Soviet Military communications ====
The Soviets were very much aware of the potential effectiveness of enemy radio intelligence. This was evident from the numerous intercepted conversations in which the parties, probably fearing that violations would be overheard and reported for administrative action, called each other's attention to security regulations or when one party broke off the conversation because of such violations at the other end.

While serving as commissar near Budennyt, a cavalry army in 1920, Generalissimo Joseph Stalin observed the defects of the Russian radio service. It was he who is supposed to have given impetus to its improvement and to have subsequently insisted upon the necessity of strict radio discipline. The work of German radio intelligence grew even more complicated by virtue of two drastic changes in the Soviet radio service during World War II. The first change occurred as early as 1 April 1942, when Army Group Centre was suddenly confronted with entirely new cryptosystems and call signs, and noticed that the authentication groups which had hitherto facilitated traffic analysis had been discontinued. This was probably because the methods then employed by German radio intelligence and the "entering wedges" spotted by the cryptanalysts had been betrayed by a deserter from an intercept unit. The changes brought about by this incident led to a setback in German intelligence results lasting several weeks. The next crisis in German communication intelligence followed the loss of Volgograd (Stalingrad), when the Soviets captured intercept files. At that time the Germans intercepted Soviet instructions concerning the restriction and supervision of radio traffic. It was surprising, however, that in spite of these stringent orders, prohibitions, and threatened penalties, and the strict, autocratic nature of the Soviet command, numerous army units and many non-military organizations nevertheless did violate the rules.

This deviation from strict adherence to regulations was one of the most vulnerable points in the Soviet radio service, and provided German long-range intelligence with reliable information along the entire front, even after the above-mentioned changes in procedure. The higher-echelon headquarters that were engaged in strategic missions, especially the tank army headquarters, observed radio silence before launching an operation, or else confined their transmissions to brief test calls, so that little useful information could be obtained from them. It was different in the case of the GHQ troops assigned to these headquarters to provide an additional boost. They exchanged lively radio traffic, not so much because of lack of discipline as for administrative and supply reasons arising from their dispersal over wide areas. They did not use the complicated cryptographic systems of their superior headquarters, but easily broken field ciphers, with the result that their carelessness nullified the precautions taken by the higher echelons.

This applied equally to the artillery divisions and artillery corps. In many instances the Germans were able to learn of plans which the higher echelon headquarters was extremely careful to keep secret by intercepting messages from such units as formations of the assault specialist, Sokolovski, and the heavy mortar, rocket launcher, and army engineer forces. In general, it was possible to obtain a fairly accurate picture of the number of armies and divisions, their location and boundaries, the arrival of reinforcement and the displacement of units, and thus the concentration of forces by observing and plotting the GHQ artillery, heavy mortar, and rocket launcher units. A captured Russian signal officer explained that this carelessness in radio operations was due to the shortages of telephone cables and field phones and the distances to be covered.

The heavy mortar and rocket launcher units always carried on a very lively radio exchange. Wherever they appeared the Germans knew that a Soviet attack was under preparation. The presence of army engineer units was often the first indication of an impending armoured offensive, before which they sent progress reports on the construction of roads, the building and reinforcement of bridges, and the clearance of lanes through the mine fields.

Additional clues to the preparation of offensive operations were furnished by messages from and to supply and service troops. When German intercept units uncovered the first two major nets of this type, Hitler erroneously interpreted them as a Russian radio deception maneuver, although radio intelligence found no reason to substantiate this opinion. In October and November 1941, a conspicuous net was observed in the vicinity of Vladimir, 120 miles east of Moscow, and another one east of Rostov. Their messages dealt with the equipment and training of numerous newly organised formations. The "Vladimir net" was believed to represent four armies; the Rostov net, ten divisions. Radio intelligence was vindicated by the counterattacks carried out by these forces in late November and early December against Rostov and in the Moscow area, where the Germans suffered disastrous setbacks.

Intercepts indicating the location of ammunition, fuel, and ration dumps provided reliable information used in the planning of German air attacks. The greater the strain in the Russians supply situation, the more intensive was the radio traffic. The German intercept units were thus able to draw pertinent conclusions concerning the tactical situation of the Allied forces.

==== Early 1943 and Volgograd steam ferries traffic ====
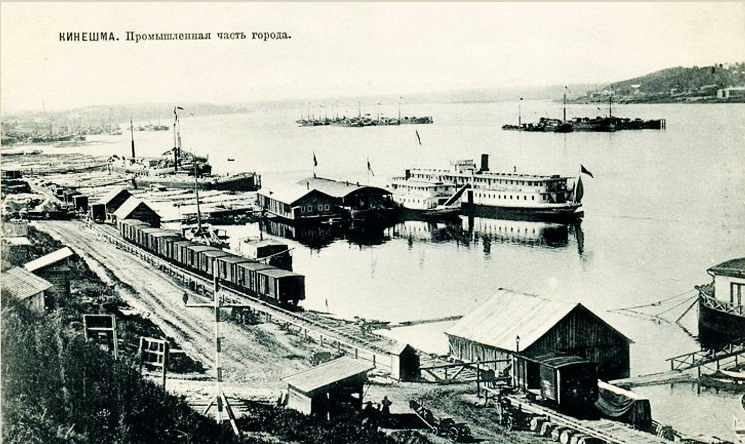
Steamboat and rail connection on Volga River at Kineshma, 1900

In front of Volgograd (Stalingrad) toward the end of 1942 and the beginning of 1943, German intercept units succeeded in intercepting messages from Volga steam ferries indicating the number of their nightly crossings which required six hours whenever ice jams were present. Other messages conveyed an impressive picture of the shipments of infantry, artillery, guns, tanks, horses, vehicles, ammunition, and miscellaneous supplies which were moved across the river. Since the daily strength reports of the Soviet (Russian) units in action were currently intercepted, it was possible to establish that only a very few of the reinforcements and supplies were intended for the decimated troops engaged in the fighting. The obvious conclusion was that the enemy was moving up entire divisions which he did not intend to commit until the beginning of a major offensive.

In some instances, German intercept units were able to follow movements by rail of newly organised divisions from the interior of the Soviet Union up to the front, first by plotting their location through D/F procedures, then by picking up their trail as soon as they established contact with the headquarters to which they were assigned.

==== German radio intelligence operations at army level ====
The following is an example of German radio intelligence operations at army level. In December 1943, ground and air reconnaissance north of Vitebsk failed to produce any significant information. On the other hand, traffic analysis, D/F plotting, and cryptanalysis of the transmissions of the radio nets operated by Russian engineer, heavy mortar, rocket launcher, artillery, and service units provided an almost complete picture of the 3rd and 4th Main Assault Armies on both sides of the Eleventh Guard Army. These forces were facing the German 3rd Panzer Army in the Gorodok-Yezerishchi area. Radio intelligence furnished the usual profusion of details about division boundaries, the location and stock level of ammunition dumps, and the exact coordinates of tank-supporting bridges, lanes through minefields, and field emplacements. At approximately H minus 10 hours radio intelligence established that the attack was imminent by observing that the Russian army command posts had been advanced up to two miles behind the main line of resistance, (MLR).

The Germans obtained accurate information on the enemy's strategic objectives by observing the radio traffic of the air force ground installations. These units appeared regularly in the centre of the fighting or wherever points of main effort were to be formed. Here they had to lay out air strips, stake off suitable terrain, build shelters, and prepare runways which were then used by airlift or close-support formations.

Valuable clues concerning the strategic and tactical plans of the Russian command could frequently be drawn from the instructions issued to partisan units, so-called strategic reconnaissance groups, and spy teams, as will be explained in greater detail in the following chapter.

==== NKVD Unit intercept operations ====
The interception of messages from NKVD units was extremely fruitful. The latter maintained their own radio net extending to the smallest unit and used their own exclusive cryptosystems. Regular and systematic coverage permitted the Germans to draw conclusions regarding the composition, organisational structure, and employment of the NKVD units. According to these observations there were two blocking lines, the first one at a distance of about six to ten miles, the second one at about 30 to 40 miles behind the Russian front. These two lines sealed off the rear areas from the zone of interior. Along many sectors of the front NKVD operations could be regularly observed down to the individual guard posts, sentry squads, and control points of the first blocking line. Although the proportions of the individual sectors under jurisdiction of the NKVD units did not exactly correspond to the boundaries and width of sectors held by army units at the front, there existed a certain interrelationship. Moreover, the NKVD failed to observe the radio silence imposed by higher-echelon headquarters. They were far less security conscious than these headquarters, probably because of the distance separating them from the front and the lack of proper supervision. The radio messages to and from the various check points often contained requests for apprehension including the names of individuals and their troop units, reports on the arrival or departure of officers, including generals, and on routine checks of travel orders, and similar matters which furnished important information about units committed at the front or stationed in rear areas.

From conspicuous organisational changes and the arrival of new NKVD units the Germans were able to draw conclusions as to the scope of impending operations. Up to the very end of the war, a great number of the NKVD cryptosystems were solved by the Germans.

==== Short- and long-range traffic ====
The characteristics of Russian radio operations made it impossible to draw a sharp line between short-range and long-range operations. As in 1943, when these two phases of intelligence activity were complementing each other successfully, three factors should be mentioned that facilitated the German radio intelligence effort:

1. The Soviets (Russians) adherence to established procedures in sending routine messages and in carrying on conversations.
2. As on other fronts, the idiosyncrasies of Soviet radio operators who were less self-disciplined, intelligent, or well trained than the average, enabled Germany to identify and observe entire divisions. Among many others their deviations from rules of procedure included variations in sending speed especially in beginning and closing a transmission, arbitrary modifications of call signs to facilitate quick recognition by the called station, peculiarities in tuning the transmitter, and mistakes in transmitting unusual signals. Technical defects, such as a chirp, also made it easy to trace a particular station.
3. Last, but not least, the Germans benefited from the fact that the steadily increasing number of Russian radio stations, for which American Lend-Lease supplied much equipment, furnished an almost inexhaustible wealth of information. The restrictions on radio traffic imposed by orders from above were apparently not implemented.

A few units, such as the II Guard Armoured Corps, observed strict radio discipline, for which an energetic commander and a security-conscious signal officer were apparently responsible. They complicated the task of German communication intelligence. ln general, however, the radio discipline standards of most front-line units was low. On the other hand, one must acknowledge that until the very day of the German capitulation, the Russians never indulged in the complete relaxation of all rules and undisciplined plain-text transmission of radio messages which was practiced by the Western Allies in anticipation of an early victory.

The following figures will convey an idea of the number of radio stations operated by the Russians at the end of 1943. Before a major offensive along the 25-mile sector held by the Third Panzer Army, German radio intelligence observed 300 enemy radio stations.

==== Established Soviet radio procedures and reports ====
Various areas of the Soviet radio system were characterized by the above-mentioned rigid adherence to established procedure which facilitated the German radio intelligence effort. For instance, several code designations used in both CW and phone communication remained unchanged for years along the entire Russian front:

- "manager" stood for chief of staff,
- "pickle" for ammunition,
- "box" for tank,
- "shop" for unit.

Battalions were designated by species of trees, such as pine, oak, or beech; companies were referred to by trades, such as shoemaker, tailor, or baker, and platoons were given names of animals, such as horse, cow, or sheep.

For years, call signs and frequencies were changed on the 1st, l0th, and 20th of each month; cryptosystems, every one to three months. A period of radio silence preceded each major offensive during which entirely new cryptosystems would be used. However, because of the previous mentioned operating characteristics, the Germans had no difficulty in resuming interception of previously known units. The routine daily reports, sent according to a fixed schedule, provided a particularly rich fund of reliable information. During the Battle of Stalingrad at the end of 1942, German radio intelligence was able to set up a systematic body of statistics on the Russian tank strength by entering the intercepted figures under the following 14 headings which were always transmitted in the same sequence in such form-type reports:

- Heading 1: T/E allowance of tanks
- Heading 2: Actual number of serviceable tanks
- Heading 3: Total losses through enemy action
- Heading 4: Permanent losses through enemy action
- Heading 5: Total. losses through wear and tear
- Heading 6: Permanent losses through wear and tear
- Heading 7: Number of unserviceable tanks on hand
- Heading 8: Number of tanks reparable by organisational maintenance
- Heading 9: Number of tanks reparable by field and depot maintenance
- Heading 10: Number of tanks requiring: repairs in the ZI
- Heading 11: Number of irreparable tanks
- Heading 12: Number of tanks received from organisational maintenance
- Heading 13: Number of tanks received from field and depot maintenance
- Heading 14: Number of tanks received from the ZI.

The following routine report was sent in the same form over a period of two years. At first it was difficult to solve. This was achieved only as the result of inquiries made by the Russian net control station. Its solution provided accurate statistical data concerning officer and enlisted personnel strength, casualties, number of guns, ammunition and gasoline supplies, the chain of command, and the location of sun positions. The numerical code used in this routine report was as follows:

Heading Number	Numerical Code	Statistical Data Within Report
1	334	334th Rocket Launcher Battalion
2	5	subordinate to Fifth Army
3	202	committed in the 202nd Infantry Division sector
4	312/407	co-ordinates of the battalion command post
5	318/414, 309/148	co-ordinates of the firing positions
6	16	number of guns
7	13/1144	1144 rounds of TS ammunition
8	12.5	12.5 tons of gasoline
9	9/60/204	number of officers, non-commissioned officers, and other enlisted men
10	0/2/4	losses: 2 non-commissioned officers, 4 enlisted men
11	140	rounds of ammunition expended
12		One infantry platoon and self-propelled gun destroyed (This part of the message in clear text)

==== After 1942 and interception of phone traffic ====
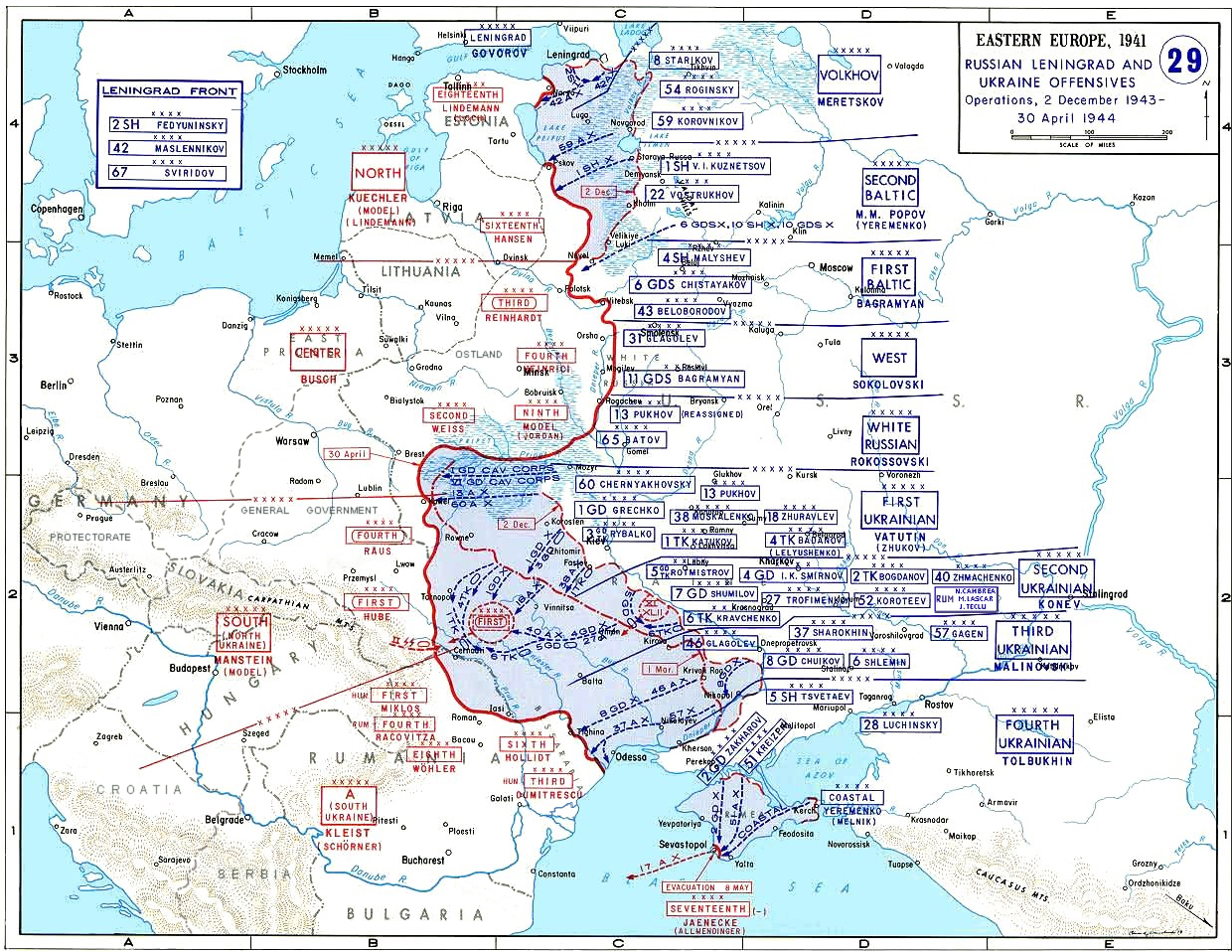
Soviet Saint Petersburg (Leningrad) and Ukraine offensive 2 December 1943 – 30 April 1944

After 1942 Russian phone traffic became increasingly important for German radio intelligence. Proper evaluation of it required the assistance of excellent translators and a fairly close proximity to the front. At a distance of approximately six to ten miles from the MLR, provided the reception was good, the evaluation of phone transmissions was easier than that of CW traffic. At the same time the interception of radio conversations in which brevity codes, code name indices and grid co-ordinate ciphers were used was continued. In general these conversations took place between tank and other mechanized units after the beginning of a major engagement. The cryptosystem used to encipher co-ordinates was as a rule quickly solved by comparing the co-ordinates with the intelligence officer's situation reports and by D/F operations. Once this had been achieved, all details of the enemy's intentions became clear soon after the beginning of the attack, inasmuch as messages concerning the attack directions, daily objectives, the course of the front line, casualties, and enemy resistance were being currently intercepted.

Some of the tactical commanders carried on conversations without taking more than the above-mentioned insignificant security precautions. In April 1945, for example, the commander of the Second Guard Armoured Army, then located in the Wriezen area east of Berlin, held conversations with his corps, brigade, and tank spearhead commanders and discussed the scope of their missions, the axis of advance, time schedules, flank protection, anti-aircraft security, and the army's objective. The latter was to thrust north of Berlin up to a point north of Potsdam, where the army would link up with forces advancing south of Berlin. Radio intelligence was able to submit an accurate report eight hours before the attack began.

During lulls in the fighting, the results of short-range interception were insignificant, particularly when the Germans faced disciplined infantry and artillery units which observed radio silence and used wire communication. The fact that an attack was pending could best be deduced from observation of an exchange of test signals (v's) at regular hourly intervals. Once an attack had started, even the infantry and artillery of front-line divisions began to engage in phone conversations, either using a brevity code or talking in the clear altogether. In contrast to these units, which were probably supervised quite strictly, there were others whose commanders conversed in the most undisciplined and uninhibited manner. They thus presented German radio intelligence with complete information on Russian plans, estimates of the situation, orders, and other data.

==== Example of Soviet phone traffic providing valuable information ====
Both the short-range units (employed above division level) and the RI teams attached to the German divisions in Russia had that experience. The following examples have been selected from among the thousands of instances in which Russian phone transmissions provided valuable information to German division commanders:

In January 1942 the RI team of the 2nd Panzer Division intercepted a plain-text Russian order for a night attack on Alexandrovka, south of Rzhev (Army Group Centre), at H minus 1 hour. The defenders were alerted, and the attack was repulsed with great losses to the Russians.

In July 1942 the German Ninth Army was mopping up the Russian pocket near Belyy, west of Rzhev. The RI team of the 2nd Panzer Division intercepted a Plaintext conversation on the subject of the intended breakout of the Soviet 82 Tank Brigade, during which all the axis of movement were mentioned. Thereupon the 2nd Panzer Division quickly blocked the routes of escape with 88-mm guns, which destroyed numerous T-34 tanks. The breakout was prevented and the rest of the brigade withdrew to the swamps in the north. The brigade's radio traffic was kept under observation, and a message requesting assistance in towing the tanks out of the swamps was intercepted. The areas indicated in these messages were combed out by German infantry, and the immobilized, but otherwise undamaged, T34 tanks were neutralised. Russian division staff tried to reorganise the scattered troops in the pocket by ordering them via radio to assemble at precisely designated collecting points. The 2nd Panzer Division artillery took them under fire, the effect of which could once again be checked by intercepting the Russian transmissions.

During the German withdrawal from Rostov to the Mius, in the winter of 1942–43, a Russian motorized corps broke through the German lines. The gap was closed and the enemy was trapped. Plaintext Russian dispatches reporting a shortage of gasoline were intercepted by the Radio Intercept (abbr RI) team of the 23rd Panzer Division. "What am I supposed to do?" asked the commander of the pocket force. "Break out at the same point where you broke through", was the answer of superior headquarters behind the Russian front. All available German forces were placed in ambush at the former breakthrough point. Nobody got through, and the Russian unit was destroyed.

==== Büffelbewegung (Buffalo Movement) ====
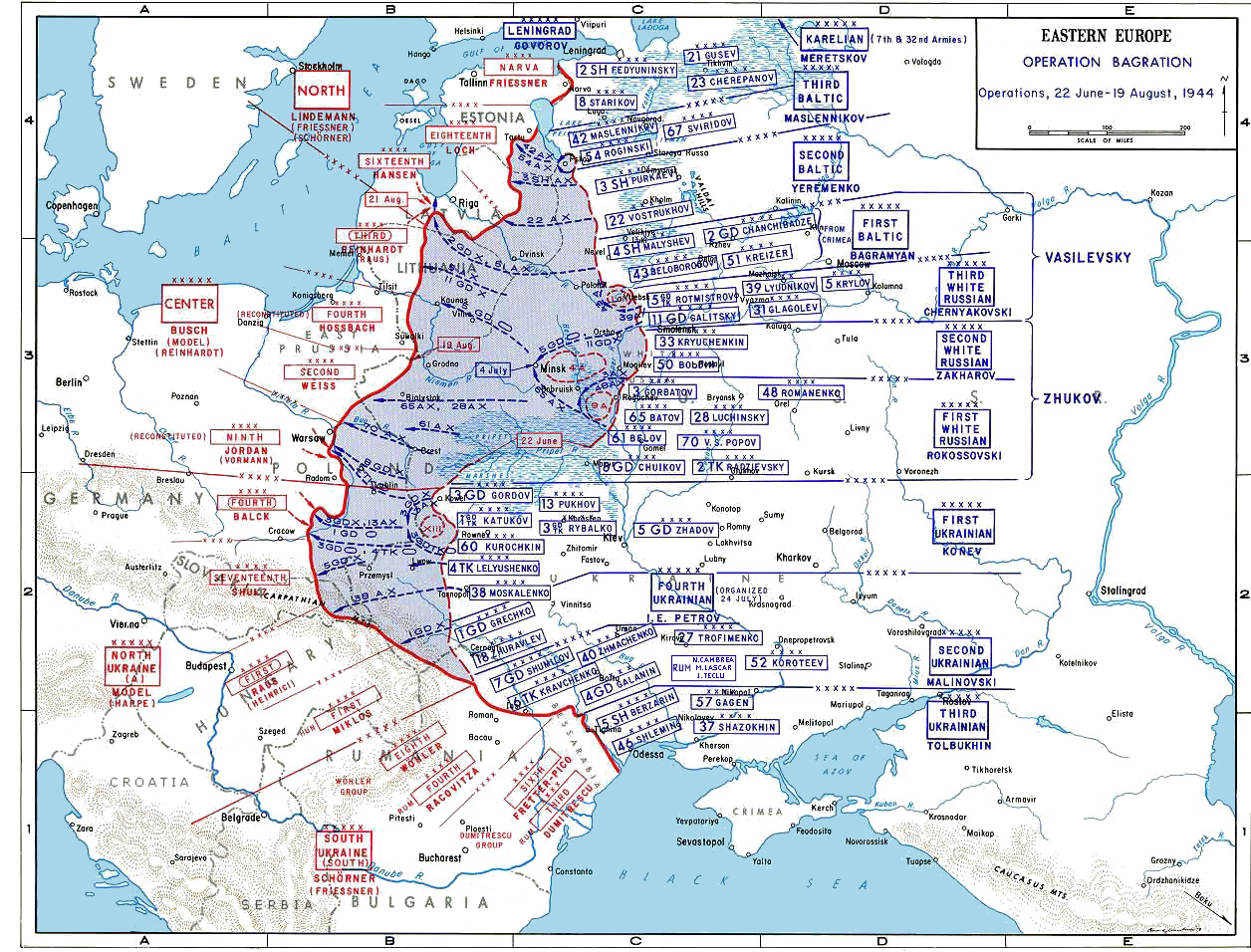
Soviet Operation Bagration offensive 22 June 1943 – 19 August 1944

In March 1943 the German 129th Infantry Division, withdrew from the Volga near Rzhev to the Smolensk-Moscow highway near Yartsevo, during the course of the so-called Buffalo Movement (German: Büffelbewegung) of the Ninth Army. Every day the division's RI team reported the approach of enemy troops to the successive German delaying positions as well as the enemy's organisation and strength, physical condition after exhausting night marches, intended rest periods, logistical problems, the Russians' estimate of the German situation, and their plans in general. In the light of this reliable first-hand information intercepted from enemy sources, the Germans were able to examine their dispositions, reinforce their units at crucial points, place their reserves at the right points, and, above all, concentrate their fire on the most vulnerable targets the enemy so carelessly revealed to them, and make the proper distribution of the available ammunition on a day-to-day basis.

In February 1944 the 23rd Panzer Division was given the mission of stopping heavy Russian attacks on Jassy. On that occasion some T-34's broke through the German lines and concealed themselves in the close terrain. They sent such messages as "our tracks are broken" or "turret damaged," whereupon the German RI team inquired: "What is your location?" As soon as they indicated their location, the tanks were destroyed by the Germans.

The Germans occasionally attempted to get a reply from Russian stations and usually succeeded in their deception. However, they refrained from intruding in enemy nets handling routine traffic in order not to arouse the suspicion of the other party. Any such action would have compromised future intelligence results. It was a different matter, however, when, in the heat of combat, the enemy asked for assistance without getting reply to his calls.

In September 1944, a Russian corps was in a precarious situation northeast of Grosswardein. The RI team of the 23rd Panzer Division intercepted a poorly encrypted message ordering a Russian-Romanian regimental combat team to attempt to break out along a certain road. Elements of the division thereupon prepared an ambush in the forest on both sides of the road and completely wiped out the breakout force.

Along the entire Russian front the reports from communication intelligence were considered as information from reliable sources.

In the autumn of 1943 Albert Praun, then chief signal officer at the headquarters of Army Group Centre, received every day intercepts of CW and voice transmissions from which it was clearly evident that in hundreds of instances German prisoners were being murdered within a short time after their capture. In each instance a Soviet (Russian) regimental or division staff officer complained that no prisoners had been turned over to headquarters and requested that at least one man should be spared from being shot or otherwise murdered so that he could be interrogated.

When, in the autumn of 1943, German forces encircled near Cherkassy succeeded in breaking out of the pocket, their overjoyed commander carelessly told propaganda officials about the tremendous help he had received from communication intelligence both while in the pocket and when breaking out of it, inasmuch as he was able to direct movements and conduct operations on the basis of intercepted Russian orders. Although this statement was publicized in the press and radio in the same imprudent manner, it did not have the disastrous consequences which had been feared for a time. Up to the end of the war the intercepts made by the RI teams on the Soviet (Russian) front remained an important source of information for the tactical commanders.

Strategic radio intelligence directed against the Russian war production effort provided a wealth of information for the evaluation of Russia's military potential. Owing to the general dearth of long-distance telephone and teletype land circuits, radio communication assumed an especially important role in Russia not only as an instrument of military leadership but also as the medium of civilian communication in a widely decentralized economy. In keeping with its large volume, most of this Russian radio traffic was transmitted by automatic means. The German Army intercepted this traffic with corresponding automatic equipment and evaluated it at the communication intelligence control centre. Multiplex radioteletype links connected Moscow not only with the so-called fronts or army groups in the field; but also with the military district headquarters in Saint Petersburg, Tbilisi, Baku, Vladivostok, and in many other cities. In addition, the radio nets used for inland navigation provided an abundance of information. Although this mechanically transmitted traffic offered a higher degree of security against interception, the Russians used the same cryptosystems as in the field for sending important military messages over these circuits. The large volume of intercepted material, offered better opportunities for German cryptanalysis. Strategic radio intelligence furnished information about the activation of new units in the zone of interior, industrial production reports, requests for materiel and replacements, complaints originating from and problems arising at the production centres and administrative agencies in control or the war economy. All this information was indexed at the communication intelligence control centre where reports were drawn up at regular intervals on the following aspects of the Russian war production effort:

- Planning and construction of new factories
- Relocation of armament plants
- Coal and iron ore production figures
- Rmv material and fuel requirements for industrial plants
- Tank and gun production figures
- Transportation facilities and problems
- Railway, inland shipping, and air communications
- Agricultural production
- Food distribution and rationing measures
- Manpower, labour allocation, and other relevant matters

Strategic radio intelligence thus made a slight dent in the Iron Curtain, which during the war was drawn even more tightly than in the 1950s, and offered some insight into the operation of the most distant Siberian production centres and the tremendous war potential of that seemingly endless expanse of land.

==== Build up to Vistula–Oder Offensive ====
The last major achievement of German radio intelligence in Russia was the coverage of the gigantic preparations for the Baranov offensive during the first days of 1945. Even though the information submitted to higher headquarters did not lead to logical, tactical, strategic, and political decisions, communication intelligence cannot be blamed for the subsequent events. Once again the usual pattern of Russian radio communication unveiled itself in front of the eyes of the German spectators. German communication intelligence, by then an instrument capable of distinguishing the finest nuance, perceived once more all the unmistakable signs of an impending offensive. First, the arrival of army engineers and the deployment of artillery, heavy mortar, and rocket launcher units which prematurely revealed the points of main effort of the inevitable concentrations of fire. Then the sparse higher-echelon traffic, which only traffic analysis and D/F plotting could evaluate and which indicated the transfer of division after division, corps after corps, and army after army, and revealed the structure of the "fronts". Finally, the gigantic proportions of the assembly forces poised for the attack were discernible from the abundance of tactical CW and voice messages, which could be easily broken, if not read simultaneous with interception. Once again the front-line divisions and tank units concealed their presence by imposing radio silence, which was not observed by the General HQ and NKVD units. Once more the combat reconnaissance teams, which at an early moment had been placed at forward points, disclosed the Russian long-range objectives in their radio traffic with the "front" headquarters. All these small pieces were put together to form a gigantic mosaic, which General Gehlen, the Chief of the Eastern Intelligence Branch, presented to Hitler and General Heinz Guderian, the Chief of the Army General Staff, during the first days of January 1945 with the assurance that, according to the observed transfers of command posts, the storm would break on 12 January 1945.

==== Soviet to German forces strength ratios ====
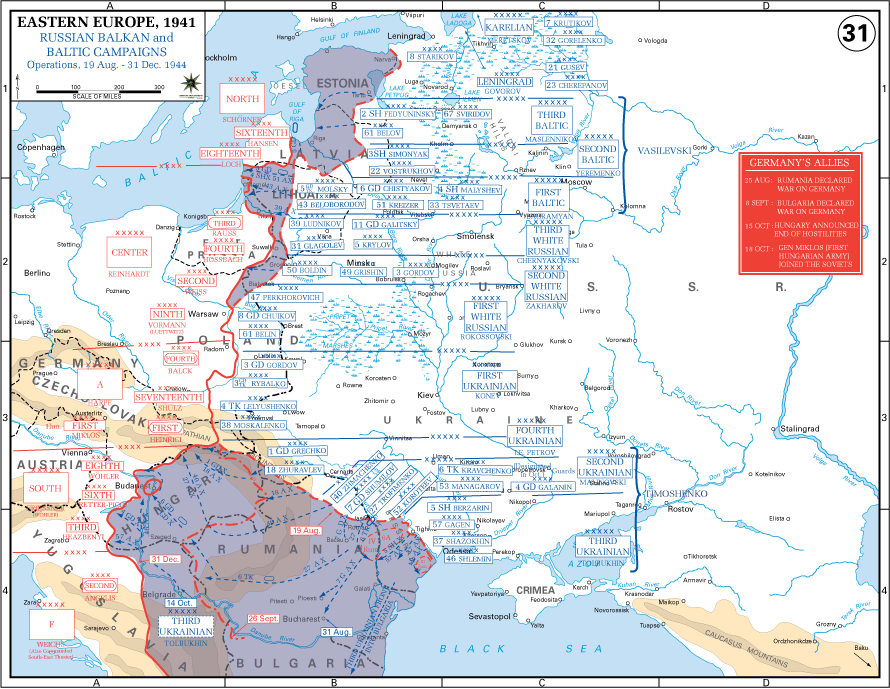
Soviet Balkan and Baltic campaigns, during August 1944 to 31 December 1945

Late in August 1944, after the collapse of Army Group Centre, which had resulted from 150 Russian rifle and 45 tank divisions having opposed 42 German divisions at a ratio of strength of 4.5:1, the Russians controlled three large strategic bridgeheads west of the Vistula, at Baranov, Pulavy, and Magnussev. Early in September 1944, came a lull in the fighting, when the available Soviet (Russian) forces lacked sufficient strength to consolidate these three bridgeheads into one and to continue the offensive in the direction of the German border. At the beginning of October, German communication intelligence had definite clues that the Russians were getting ready to resume the offensive from the three bridgeheads. During September 1944, the picture had been greatly obscured by the fact that they had switched to the defensive. During November the arrival of four new army groups, two opposite the East Prussian border and two between Modlin and Baranov, was observed. Points of main effort were being built up in the latter two areas from which thrusts in the direction of Baranov–Silesia–Saxony and Pulavy–Warthegau–Berlin were to be executed. By 9 January the disposition of strength between Russian and German forces had developed into a ratio or 11:1 for infantry, 7:1 for armour, and 20:1 for artillery. At the points of main effort the Soviets (Russians) had massed 400 guns per mile of frontage. In this area the Germans were still able to supplement the results of communication intelligence by air reconnaissance, which provided information on the arrival of motorized and tank units as well as data on the assembly of artillery forces which moved up during the hours or darkness.

When the storm finally broke on 12 January 1945, the defense forces in the front lines, their superior headquarters, and the Chief of the Army General Staff were not surprised by the fury of the assault, the Russian points of main effort, or the directions or their attacks.

==== Timeless laws of warfare ignored by Hitler ====
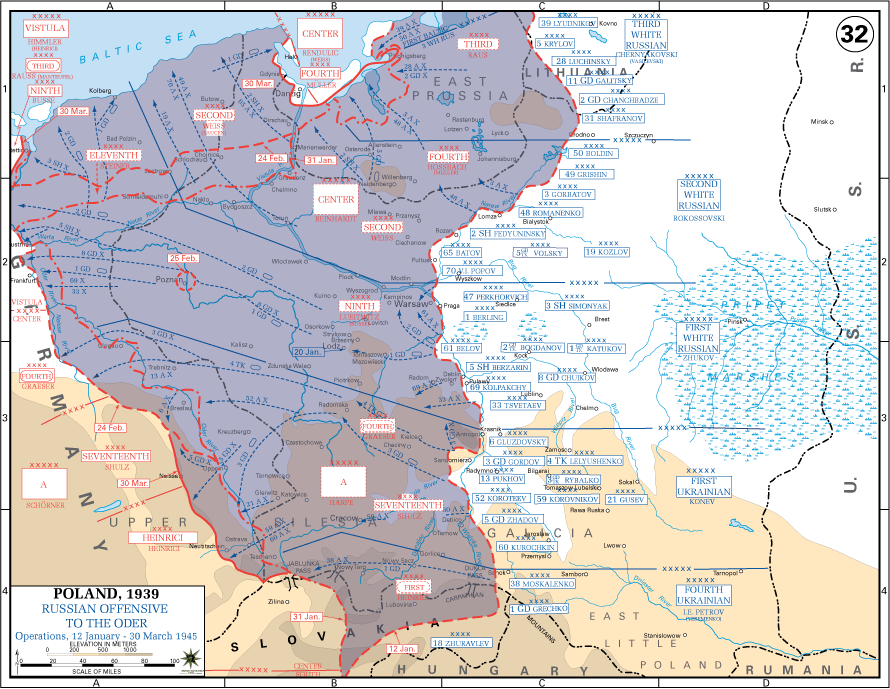
Soviet offensive to the Oder 12 January 1945 to March 1945

Prior to that, Hitler, who refused to admit the superiority of his hated enemy, Stalin, had told General Reinhard Gehlen that "this information reminded him of the ravings of a madman."

Hitler was convinced that he was a genius who could ignore the timeless laws of warfare which permit a military leader to make major decisions solely on the basis of a clear and realistic estimate of the situation. Such an estimate must take into account all external factors and must stress realism and accuracy in the appraisal of one's own resources as well as those of the enemy. Hitler's disregard of the latter factor was perhaps due to the fact that his intuition had helped him to estimate accurately the real military potential and fighting ability of his initial enemies, the Czechs, Poles, and French, with greater accuracy than did many of his military advisers who had based their judgment on their World War I experience. To an intuitive estimate of the situation before the first shot was fired, the regular peacetime intelligence media, including communication intelligence, could make only modest contributions. Once the first overt act of war had been committed and a certain period of initial adjustment was over, German communication intelligence was able to furnish the military leadership with a wealth of reliable information which was appreciated by the General Staff and senior commanders in the field.

==== Clear details provided by communication intelligence ====
In the Soviet (Russian) theatre the mass of minute details assembled by German communication intelligence over a period of years provided a clear, reliable, and almost complete picture of the military potential, the strategic objectives, and the tactical plans of the most powerful enemy which the German Army had ever encountered. The results were far superior to those obtained during World War I.

== Transcript of an intercept made ==
The following is a transcript of an intercept made by the RI Unit of the 252nd Infantry Division in the Gzhatsk Area on 24 February 1943. Prepared from private records in the possession of Colonel (German: Oberst) Leo Hepp. Explanation of code designations:

- Napor: Soviet (Russian) radio operator at Leskino command post
- Upor: Russian artillery command post station
- Sorja: Russian radio operator at the command post of supporting elements
- Kedr: Intermediate link between Napor, Upor, and Sorja
- Skowa: Russian radio operator at superior headquarters

=== Intercept transcript ===
Left column is time. Right is message.

- 0453 Napor to Upor via Kedr: I am now at Vorobyevo. Contact me under 056.
- 0620 Napor to Skowa via Kedr: Move 44 (presumably reinforcements) to this place immediately.
- 0700 Napor to Upor via Kedr: Direct supporting fire immediately 100 yards west of Vorobyevo. 06 012 immediate reinforcements.
- 0705 Repetition of a message transmitted at 0700 hours.
- 0707 Napor to Upor via Kedr: Enemy attacking. Direct artillery fire on Klushino. Ammunition supply is low.
- 0730 Uapor to Upor via Kedr: Enemy withdrawing from Klushino. Direct heavier fire on Klushino immediately.
- 0734 Napor to Upor via Kedr: Lift fire 550 yards. Fire one more salvo. Fire was right on target. Enemy evacuating Klushino.
- 0740 Napor to Upor via Kedr: Give immediate fire support, enemy attacking.
- 0747 Napor to Upor via Kedr: Lift fire 1500 yards on woods at 40 yards distance from Vorobyevo. Urgently require artillery support.
- 0753 Napor to Upor via Kedr: Lift fire 450 yards urgently need fire!
- 0754 Upor to Napor via Kedr: State precisely where fire should really be directed. To Klushino or to Kusnetshiki?
- 0800 Napor to Upor via Kedr: Immediately direct artillery fire 100 yards west of Vorobyevo. Enemy attacking.
- 0810 Upor to Napor via Kedr: Nodov has left and brings needed supply (ammunition).
- 0815 Napor to Upor via Kedr: We urgently need reinforcements. Enemy attacking. We are out of ammunition.
- 0820 Upor to Napor via Kedr: How strong is attacking enemy force?
- 0821 Napor to Upor via Kedr: Enemy is far superior. Only a few of us left. I am alone at radio set.
- 0823 Napor to Upor via Kedr: We are throwing our last men into the fighting. Up to now no artillery fire has hit designated targets.
- 0830 Upor to Napor via Kedr: Vorobyevo must be held under all circumstances. Signed 44.
- 0835 Bapor to Upor via Kedr: Fire steadily on western part of Vorobyevo. Up to now I have not noticed any artillery fire.
- 0840 Napor to Upor via Kedr: I am not at present in Vorobyevo but in Leskino.
- 0848 Napor to Upor via Kedr: Enemy attacking from all sides. Fire should now be lifted 1650 yards to the western edge of Leskino.
- 0853 Upor to Napor via Kedr: Which unit is actually in Vorobyevo and how is the situation there?
- 0857 Napor to Upor via Kedr: Enemy is again attacking from all sides.
- 0859 Napor to Upor via Kedr: Need immediate artillery support. Leskino is burning. There is house-to-house fighting.
- 0902 Napor to Upor via Kedr: Direct artillery fire 900 yards west of Leskino.
- 0904 Upor to Napor via Kedr: How greatly are you outnumbered by the enemy?
- 0906 Napor to Upor via Kedr: There are only a few men left and we are fighting for every house. Urgently request reinforcements and artillery support.
- 0910 Upor to Napor via Kedr: Immediately take up defensive position facing west until reinforcements arrive. Reinforcements will link up with you at the forester's house in the woods near Vorobyevo.
- 0912 Napor or to Upor via Kedr: We will hold out to the last man.
- 0915 Napor to Upor via Kedr: Shells are on target, continue fighting in same manner.
- 0916 Upor to Napor via Kedr: Report immediately as soon as reinforcements have linked up with you.
- 0925 Upor to Napor via Kedr: Who is with Kosterjev?
- 0926 Napor to Upor via Kedr: Kostarjev is wounded.
- 0928 Upor to Napor via Kedr: In what condition is Kostarjev and where is he?
- 0929 Napor to Upor via Kedr: He is under cover but does not leave the field of fire.
- 0930 Upor to Napor via Kedr: We shall start firing right away. Report precisely where shells hit.
- 0935 Napor to Upor via Kedr: I have not seen any artillery fire until now. Urgently need artillery support.
- 0945 Napor to Upor via Kedr: Direct fire on Leskino immediately. I am at the edge of the village.
- 0947 Upor to Napor via Kedr: I will fire immediately, report where shells hit.
- 0948 Napor to Upor via Kedr: I understand. I shall report where shells hit.
- 0950 Napor to Upor via Kedr: Shells are hitting target. Continue firing on the same target.
- 0955 Sorja to Napor via Kedr: We are advancing toward you in direction of Vorobyevo.
- 1005 Napor to Sorja via Kedr: Attack Vorobyevo immediately with one company. The remaining forces should link up with us.
- 1030 Sorja to Napor via Kedr: We are fighting our way through Yagorna (wooded area near Vorobyevo). We have suffered heavy losses from enemy fire. Only 30 and 40 men respectively are left of the two companies.
- 1037 Upor to Napor via Kedr: From which direction is the enemy firing!
- 1039 Napor to Upor via Kedr: Give artillery support on Vorobyevo immediately. Kostarjev's group is fighting in the woods.
- 1043 Upor to Napor via Kedr: I am falling back on Vorobyevo. Enemy is firing on us from wooded area.
- 1045 Upor to Napor via Kedr: Report exactly where you are and where you want artillery fire to be placed. Bear in mind that our troops are in your rear.
- 1100 Napor to Upor via Kedr: Direct fire north of wooded area near Vorobyevo.
- 1135 Sorja to Napor via Kedr: The rations destined for you are now at the jump-off positions. We are awaiting your detail. Signed: Chochlov.
- 1142 Napor to Sorja via Kedr: Urgently request artillery support on Kusnetahiki. We are out of ammunition. Support did not arrive. Signed: Sokolov.
- 1143 Napor to Sorja via Kedr: We cannot send a ration detail because we are encircled.
- 1150 Upor to Napor via Kedr: You can pick up a storage battery for your radio.
- 1152 Napor to Upor via Kedr: We cannot pick up the storage battery either.
- 1153 Hapor to Upor for Sorja via Kedr: Where are the reinforcements?
- 1200 Upor to Napor via Kedr: The reinforcements are at edge of the forest at Yagorna (near Vorobyevo).
- 1210 Napor to Upor via Kedr: What happened to artillery support?
- 1212 Naper to Upor via Kedr: We are still without artillery support. Fire immediately on the village of Leskino.
- 1224 Napor to Upor via Kedr: Artillery fire! Artillery fire! Artillery fire! On the village of Leskino.
- 1226 Napor to Upor via Kedr: Up to now only one shell has come over end that was a dud.
- 1234 Napor to Upor via Kedr: Shells lending in northern part of the village. Place fire 550 yards to the left. Every round is a dud.
- 1235 Napor to Upor via Kedr: We cannot fall back, we are surrounded.
- 1238 Upor to Napor via Kedr: Hold out until dusk, then attempt to break
- 1240 Napor to Upor via Kedr: We have only a few men left, but we shall hold out.
- 1242 Napor to Upor via Kedr: Shells landing 450 yards north of village of Leskino. Shift fire 200 yards to the rear and 200 yards further left. Nothing but duds.
- 1245 Upor to Napor via Kedr: We are now firing shrapnel. Report exact position of fire immediately.
- 1248 Upor to Napor via Kedr: Drutshenko has driven the Germans out of their positions south of Leskino. Your orders are to take possession of the Kussel area.
- 1304 Napor to Upor via Kedr: The first and third shells were well on the target. Shift fire 350 yards to left and increase. Enemy is in strong force.
- 1306 Upor to Napor: From now on communicate directly. We are starting to fire.
- 1307 Napor to Upor: Shift fire 350 yards to lift and 350 yards.
- 1310 Napor to Upor: We urgently need artillery support.
- 1317 Napor to Upor: Shift fire 450 yards to left and lift 350 yards immediately because shells are landing on our own men.
- 1327 Upor to Napor: Report immediately where smaller calibre shells are hitting.
- 1332 Napor to Upor: Cease fire immediately, you are hitting our own positions.
- 1337 Napor to Upor: Can we count on support?
- 1343 Napor to Upor: Enemy attacking from all sides.
- 1344 Upor to Napor: You must hold out until dusk. Nothing else is possible.
- 1345 Napor to Upor: Cease fire immediately.
- 1400 Upor to Napor: Should I resume artillery support?
- 1435 Napor to Upor: Not at present.
- 1440 Napor to Upor: Direct fire on me immediately.
- 1445 Upor to Napor: Hold out until dusk. Then you will get some real help.
- 1448 Napor to Upor: Request immediate artillery support 450 yards to the right.
- 1449 Napor to Upor: We will hold out to the last man.
- 1450 Upor to Napor: Inform Kosterovo that he has been awarded the Alexanderevski decoration. Congratulations from the commander of the 44th.
- 1457 Upor to Napor: Report exact impact area. and necessary adjustment immediately.
- 1458 Napor to Upor: Lift fire 900 yards. There are no more duds among the shells.
- 1500 Napor to Upor: Enemy attacking with tanks.
- 1504 Upor to Napor: How far away from you are the tanks?
- 1505 Napor to Upor: The tanks are 100 yards front us. All our antitank weapons have been destroyed by the enemy.
- 1506 Upor to Napor: With what ammunition should we fire on the tanks?
- 1507 Napor to Upor: Fire on our positions immediately.
- 1508 Napor to Upor: Altogether we have only twenty men left.
- 1510 Napor to Upor: The tanks are coming closer and closer.
- 1524 Upor to Napor: Are the tanks advancing from the north or south?
- 1525 Napor to Upor: They are coming from the south. Fire quickly.
- 1534 Napor to Upor: The tanks are attacking from the south, the infantry from southwest. Fire more rapidly.
- 1538 Napor to Upor: More fire.
- 1538 Upor to Napor: The automatic gun cannot shoot that far. With what forces is the enemy attacking?
- 1539 Napor to Upor: With nine tanks and one infantry battalion.
- 1539 Upor to Napor: From which side is the battalion attacking?
- 1540 Napor to Upor: The houses are all burned down. Fire more rapidly.
- 1541 Napor to Upor: Shells landed well.
- 1542 Upor to Napor: If you get a chance withdraw to the east.
- 1543 Napor to Upor: Impossible! Fire more rapidly. It you give us more fire support, we can repulse the attacks.
- 1550 Napor to Upor: Heavier fire!
- 1600 Upor to Napor: We are firing more rapidly.
- 1603 Upor to Napor: Where did the shells land?
- 1604 Napor to Upor: Everything is confused. They are attacking from all sides.
- 1605 Upor to Napor: Where are Kosterov and Sokolov?
- 1606 Napor to Upor: I don't know where Kosterov is, Sokolov is dead.
- 1608 Upor to Napor: Totshinko and someone else will take care of you.
- 1610 Napor to Upor: Situation is very serious, the shells are exploding ten yards in front of us. Fire more rapidly. We are lost, all of us.
- 1626 Napor to Upor: What about help? From where can we expect help?
- 1628 Napor to Upor: This is the last time that I am calling!
- 1629 Upor to Napor: Destroy all documents! Be heroes!
- 1631 Napor to Upor: We are fighting to the last round. We still have two or three left.
- 1635 Napor to Upor: The only ones left are three radio operators. May we withdraw?
- 1636 Upor to Napor: Fight to the last, we shall not forget you. Give us the three names. Napor failed to answer.
