= BAMS =

BAMS may refer to:

- Bachelor of Ayurveda, Medicine and Surgery, a professional medical degree in medicine focused on Ayurveda
- Bambang Reguna Bukit (born 1983; usually called Bams), a Canadian - Indonesian singer and songwriter
- Binary angular measurement system - a digital representation of angles used by computers
- British Art Medal Society
- Broad Area Maritime Surveillance, American military program
- Broadcast to Allied Merchant Ships, an encryption system used by the British Admiralty during World War II
- Bulletin of the American Mathematical Society
- Bulletin of the American Meteorological Society
- BAM Shallow, a tropical cyclone forecast model

== See also ==
- BAM (disambiguation)
