= Ferdinand Voegele =

- Born: 12 February 1896
- Military career
- Allegiance: Nazi Germany
- Branch: Luftwaffe
- Commands: Luftnachrichten Abteilung 350
- Conflicts: Second World War

Ferdinand Voegele (born 12 February 1896 in Hollfeld, Kingdom of Bavaria; died after 1946) was a German philologist and linguistic cryptanalyst, before and during the time of World War II and who would eventually lead the cipher bureau of the Luftwaffe Signal Intelligence Service (German: Oberbefehlshaber der Luftwaffe).

== Life ==
During World War I he served as a volunteer. Later he studied oriental languages at various German universities, finally specializing in Philology. Using his language skills, he started work in an export business. Eventually moving abroad for several years, but returned in the summer of 1935, when he was offered a position as an interpreter with the German Air Ministry.

== Military Work ==
Between July and September 1935, he undertook training near Kladow, near Berlin in Morse Telegraphy (Wireless telegraphy), German cryptographic procedures and radio communications. In October 1935, he posted to a fixed intercept station of the Army at Stuttgart until January 1936. During his time there, he translated plain-language radio messages from French Army and Air Force. In addition, he was employed on evaluation and traffic analysis. Between March and April 1936, he was ordered to a two-month maneuver employed as an airborne radio operators with KG254 in Kitzingen. His grade during this time was Officer candidate.

=== First Success ===
From May to October 15 he succeeded in breaking the recipherment used in conjunction with a French 3 digit code, the basis of which had already been largely reconstructed. After the start of the Spanish Civil War he solved many 4-alphabetic Substitution ciphers.

On 15 October, Voegele was transferred to a new Luftwaffe Intercept Station (Codename:W-15) (Stadelheim Transmitter) close to Munich, where he translated French, Italian and Yugoslavia intercepts.

=== Chi-Stelle ===
On 1 January 1937, he was assigned to the newly created cipher bureau (German: Chi-Stelle) within Referat K and made Chief of all cryptanalytic work (Cryptanalysis) on 1 January 1937. He was assigned as an assistant, Edward Von Lingen who had learned Russian Army cryptanalysis while at the German Army intercept station in Treuenbrietzen. When Voegele joined Chi-Stelle it consisted of 12 people.

During the remainder of the year, Voegele worked on Spanish cyphers as part of monitoring the Republicans in the Spanish Civil War. He also worked on several Czechoslovak bigraphic procedures (Polygraphic substitution), and on breaking the Czechoslovak Air Force double-transposition, where the message count only amounted to 10-25 messages per day.

Voegele was known to have worked on a number of cyphers during the course of the war. These included the Government Telegraph Code, India Code, Syko, the RAF 4-digit code, Aircraft Movement Code in Autumn 1942, Bomber Code in Winter 1942, January 1943, Slidex in May 1943, Aircraft Reporting Code from July 1943, UCO Weather Code from May 1944 and Weather Codes throughout the war. Typex was attempted by Voegele in the early 1940s.

Ferdinand Voegele disappears from the historical record after the end of the war.
