= Radio silence =

Telecommunications status

In telecommunications, radio silence or emissions control (EMCON) is a status in which all fixed or mobile radio stations in an area are asked to stop transmitting for safety or security reasons.

The term "radio station" may include anything capable of transmitting a radio signal. A single ship, aircraft, or spacecraft, or a group of them, may also maintain radio silence.

== Amateur radio Wilderness Protocol ==
The Wilderness Protocol recommends that those stations able to do so should monitor the primary (and secondary, if possible) frequency every three hours starting at 7:00 p.m., local time, for 5 minutes starting at the top of every hour, or even continuously.

The Wilderness Protocol is now included in both the ARRL ARES Field Resources Manual and the ARES Emergency Resources Manual. Per the manual, the protocol is:

The Wilderness protocol (see page 101, August 1995 QST) calls for hams in the wilderness to announce their presence on, and to monitor, the national calling frequencies for five minutes beginning at the top of the hour, every three hours from 7:00 a.m. to 7:00 p.m. while in the back country. A ham in a remote location may be able to relay emergency information through another wilderness ham who has better access to a repeater. National calling frequencies: 52.525, 146.52, 223.50, 446.00, 1294.50 MHz.

Priority transmissions should begin with the LITZ (Long Interval Tone Zero or Long Time Zero) DTMF signal for at least 5 seconds. CQ like calls (to see who is out there) should not take place until after 4 minutes after the hour.

== Maritime mobile service ==
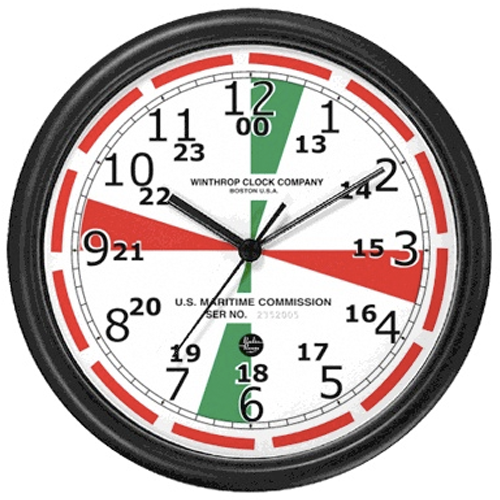
Radio room clock, showing the 500 kHz silence periods (red wedges), the 2182 kHz silence periods (green wedges), and alternating red and white bars around the circumference to aid manual transmission of the 4-second SOLAS signal.

=== Distress calls ===
Radio silence can be used in nautical and aeronautical communications to allow faint distress calls to be heard. In the former case, the controlling station can order other stations to stop transmitting with the proword "Seelonce Seelonce Seelonce". (The word uses an approximation of the French pronunciation of the word silence, "See-LAWNCE."). Once the need for radio silence is finished, the controlling station lifts radio silence by the prowords "Seelonce FINI." Disobeying a Seelonce Mayday order constitutes a serious criminal offence in most countries. The aviation equivalent of Seelonce Mayday is the phrase or command "Stop Transmitting - Distress (or Mayday)". "Distress traffic ended" is the phrase used when the emergency is over. Again, disobeying such an order is extremely dangerous and is therefore a criminal offence in most countries.

=== Silent periods ===
Up until the procedure was replaced by the Global Maritime Distress and Safety System (August 1, 2013 in the U.S.), maritime radio stations were required to observe radio silence on 500 kHz (radiotelegraph) for the three minutes between 15 and 18 minutes past the top of each hour, and for the three minutes between 45 and 48 minutes past the top of the hour; and were also required to observe radio silence on 2182 kHz (upper-sideband radiotelephony) for the first three minutes of each hour (H+00 to H+03) and for the three minutes following the bottom of the hour (H+30 to H+33).

For 2182 kHz, this is still a legal requirement, according to 47 CFR 80.304 – Watch requirement during silence periods.

== Military ==
An order for Radio silence is generally issued by the military where any radio transmission may reveal troop positions, either audibly from the sound of talking, or by radio direction finding. In extreme scenarios Electronic Silence ('Emissions Control' or EMCON) may also be put into place as a defence against interception.

In the British Army, the imposition and lifting of radio silence will be given in orders or ordered by control using 'Battle Code' (BATCO). Control is the only authority to impose or lift radio silence either fully or selectively. The lifting of radio silence can only be ordered on the authority of the HQ that imposed it in the first place. During periods of radio silence a station may, with justifiable cause, transmit a message. This is known as Breaking Radio Silence. The necessary replies are permitted but radio silence is automatically re-imposed afterwards. The breaking station transmits its message using BATCO to break radio silence.

The command for imposing radio silence is:

Hello all stations, this is 0. Impose radio silence. Over.

Other countermeasures are also applied to protect secrets against enemy signals intelligence.

Electronic emissions can be used to plot a line of bearing to an intercepted signal, and if more than one receiver detects it, triangulation can estimate its location. Radio direction finding (RDF) was critically important during the Battle of Britain and reached a high state of maturity in early 1943 with the aid of United States institutions aiding British Research and Development under the pressures of the continuing Battle of the Atlantic during World War II when locating U-boats. One key breakthrough was marrying MIT/Raytheon developed CRT technology with pairs of RDF antennas giving a differentially derived instant bearing useful in tactical situations, enabling escorts to run down the bearing to an intercept. The U-boat command of Wolfpacks required a minimum once daily communications check-in, allowing new Hunter-Killer groups to localize U-boats tactically from April on, leading to dramatic swings in the fortunes of war in the battles between March, when the U-boats sank over 300 allied ships and "Black May" when the allies sank at least 44 U-boats—each without orders to exercise EMCON/radio silence.

== Other uses ==
Radio silence can be maintained for other purposes, such as for highly sensitive radio astronomy. Radio silence can also occur for spacecraft whose antenna is temporarily pointed away from Earth in order to perform observations, or there is insufficient power to operate the radio transmitter, or during re-entry when the hot plasma surrounding the spacecraft blocks radio signals.

In the USA, CONELRAD and EBS (which are now discontinued), and EAS (which is currently active) are also ways of maintaining radio silence, mainly in broadcasting, in the event of an attack.

== Examples of radio silence orders ==
- Radio silencing helped hide the Japanese attack on Pearl Harbor in World War II. The attackers had used AM radio station KGU in Honolulu as a homing signal.
- On June 2, 1942, during World War II, a nine-minute air-raid alert, including at 9:22 pm a radio silence order applied to all radio stations from Mexico to Canada.
- In January 1965, Syrian Armed Forces observed a period of radio silence which successfully detected Mossad spy Eli Cohen who was transmitting espionage work to Israel.

== See also ==
- Dead air
- Guard band
- Mapimí Silent Zone
- Radio quiet zone
- CONELRAD
- Dark (broadcasting)
