= Rodger Winn =

British judge and Royal Navy intelligence officer

The Right Honourable Sir Rodger Winn CB OBE
- Born: Charles Rodger Noel Winn; 22 December 1903; King's Norton, Worcestershire, England
- Died: 4 June 1972 (aged 68)
- Military career
- Allegiance: United Kingdom
- Branch: Naval Intelligence Division, Royal Naval Volunteer Reserve
- Rank: Captain
- Commands: Director, Submarine Tracking Room, Admiralty
- Conflicts: World War II: Atlantic
- Awards: (1965); Kt (1959); CB (12 June 1947); OBE (1 January 1943); LM (17 July 1945)
- Other work: Junior Counsel to the Treasury (Common Law) (1954-1959); Judge of High Court of Justice, Queen's Bench Division (1959-1965); Lord Justice of Appeal (1965-1971); Lord Chancellor's Law Reform Committee (1963-); Criminal Law Revision Committee (1964-); Chairman, Permanent Security Committee (1964-1971); Committee on Personal Injury Litigation (1966-1968); Governor of St Thomas' Hospital and Chairman of Council of Medical School (1965-1970)

Sir Charles Rodger Noel Winn, CB, OBE (22 December 1903 – 4 June 1972) was a British judge and Royal Navy intelligence officer who led the tracking of German U-boat operations during World War II.

== Early life ==
Charles Rodger Noel Winn was born on 22 December 1903 in Barnt Green, Worcestershire, England to Joan and Ernest Winn. He had a younger brother, Godfrey Herbert Winn who was born 1906.

Winn suffered from polio as a child, leaving him with crippled legs and a stooped posture. He was educated at Oundle School. Notwithstanding his disability, he obtained degrees from Trinity College, Cambridge and Harvard Universities. He was called to the bar by the Inner Temple in 1928 and joined the chambers of Sir Patrick Hastings.

== War service ==
At the outbreak of war in 1939, Winn volunteered for service as an interrogator of German prisoners. But he was soon assigned to the Admiralty's Submarine Tracking Room (part of the Operational Intelligence Centre – OIC), although he was still a civilian. Though new to the naval environment, he quickly came to understand U-boat tactics, and could frequently predict their actions. As a result, he was promoted on 1 February 1941 to command the Tracking Room, as a temporary Commander in the Royal Naval Volunteer Reserve. It is a measure of his ability that he received this rank and position without formal naval officer training, which was unprecedented at the time, and that he displaced his former superior. Winn's advancement was no surprise to his colleagues and he extended his influence within the OIC.

During the German attacks on shipping off the U.S. coast, Winn was sent to America to put the British case. His arguments and expertise proved effective; he managed to persuade Admiral Ernest King (the formidable USN commander in chief), to implement a convoy system.

Winn was a keen student of ULTRA intelligence. From ULTRA and his observations of U-boat movements, he deduced that German codebreakers had cracked the BAMS (Broadcast to Allied Merchant Ships) code used by the Admiralty for convoy operations. In 1943 he eventually convinced the Admiralty to make the necessary revisions to BAMS. After the war, captured records showed that the German Navy's Beobachtungsdienst (Signals Intelligence Service) had been reading BAMS since the start of the conflict.

In 1944, the Germans equipped the U-boats with snorkels, so that they could operate without surfacing. It was still extremely difficult for a U-boat to navigate without surfacing. But U-boats operating in the dangerous waters south of Ireland managed anyway. Winn guessed that they were using their depth sounders to locate and fix on a particular conical seamount. He arranged for a double agent to send a bogus message, warning the Germans of a new British minefield "where [the U-boats] go to fix their position." The Germans soon declared a zone 60 miles square, prohibited to U-boats and centered on that seamount.

Winn's war-time work was crucial to the Allied success in the Battle of the Atlantic. Without this success, Britain might have been forced out of the war.

By the war's end, Winn attained the rank of Captain. His reputation and influence extended to the United States, where his Tracking Room was the model for a similar facility. He received an OBE in 1943, and the American Legion of Merit in 1945.

== Post-war career ==
Winn returned to the Bar after the war. From 1954 to 1959, he served as Junior Counsel to the Treasury (Common Law).

He was appointed as a judge of the High Court in 1959, assigned to the Queen's Bench Division and served in that role until 1965. From 1965 to 1971 he was a Lord Justice of Appeal and was made a Privy Counsellor. He also served on several important official and legal committees.

From 1965 to 1970 he was Governor of St Thomas' Hospital and Chairman of Council of Medical School.

Winn died in Lambert, London on 4 June 1972 and was interred in Golden Green Crematorium, Borough of Barnet, London.

== Personal life ==
On 27 September 1930 he married Helen Joyce Sydenham, the daughter of Evelyn (nee Scott) and Colonel Edward Verrinder Sydenham. Helen had been born in Kings Norton on 20 January 1899.

Rodger and Helen had a daughter. Helen Winn died in Westminster, London in March 1979.

== Honours and awards ==
- Privy Councillor (1965)
- Knight Bachelor (1959)
- Companion of the Order of the Bath (12 June 1947)
- Officer of the Order of the British Empire (1 January 1943)
- Officer of the Legion of Merit, United States (17 July 1945)
