= Broadcast to Allied Merchant Ships =

WWII system of broadcasts for convoys

Broadcast to Allied Merchant Ships (BAMS) was a protocol and system of broadcasts for Allied merchant ship convoys that was used during World War II to provide for the transmission of official messages to merchant ships in any part of the world. The BAMS system is designed for communication by the best employment of radio stations available.

== Background ==
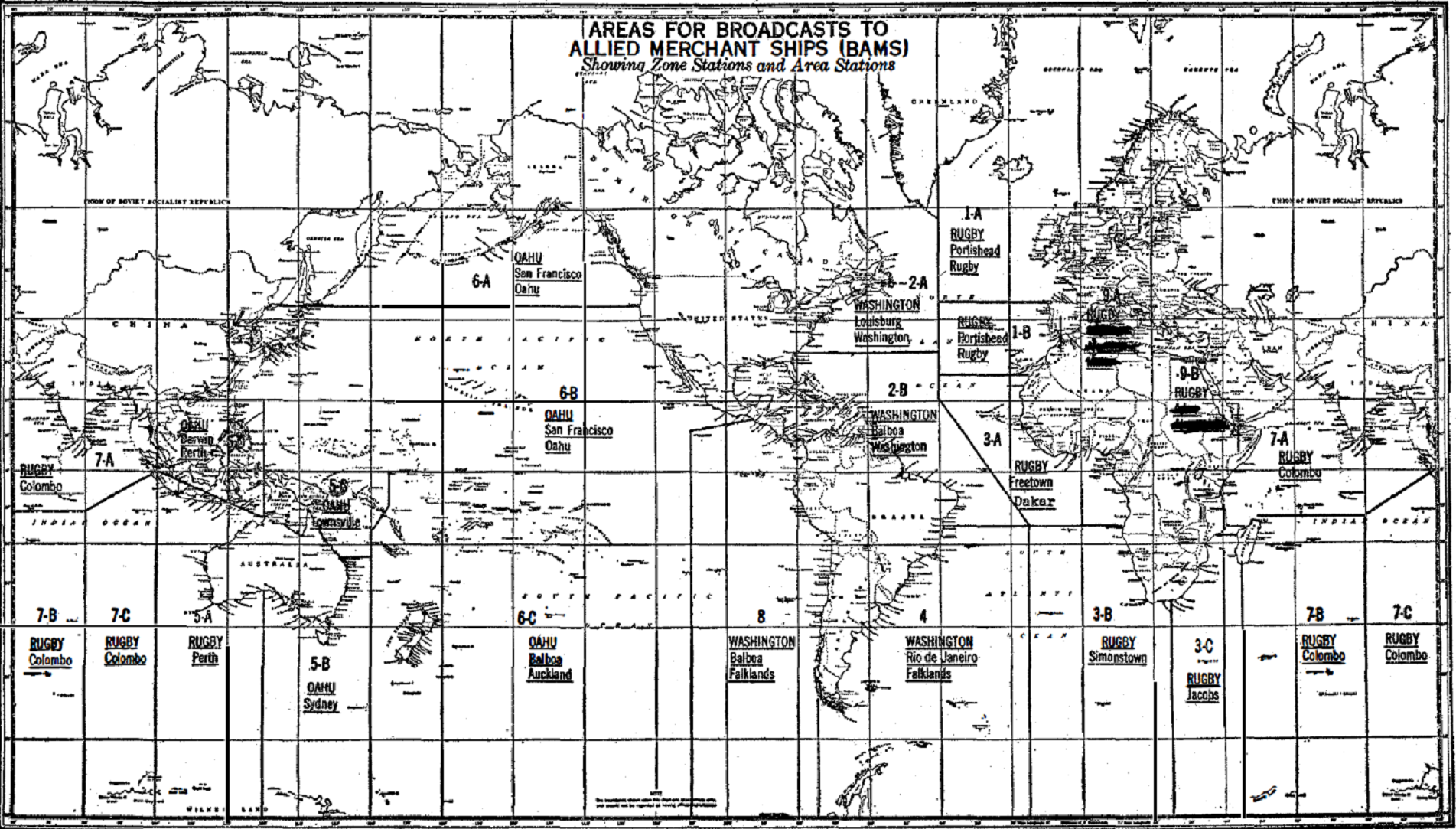
BAMS Zones of Operation across the world 1944.

On the outbreak of World War II, the British Admiralty took over control from the GPO, and the embryo merchant ship broadcast system, called GBMS came into force. Ships listened at routine times to the Rugby Radio Station and to area stations, otherwise keeping watch on the international distress frequency at 500 kHz. After the fall of France, the Admiralty assumed control of all Allied merchant shipping which complied with British procedures. When America entered the war, the world was divided into two strategic zones, the Admiralty being responsible for merchant shipping in one, and the United States Navy in the other.

The GBMS organisation proved to be inadequate for the efficient clearance of traffic for a number of reasons, including poor coverage by wireless telegraphy (W/T) stations, obsolescent equipment, and many ships only able to listen at single or two operator periods. The systems gradually improved, and from 1942 all Allied merchant ships had to have two radio technicians on board, with more modern equipment being fitted to ships.

In 1942, the GBMS system was superseded by the combined Anglo-American system of BAMS, and the addition of US Navy W/T stations improved the poor coverage. For ship to shore communications, under radio silence, ships in convoy passed any essential messages through their escort for transmission. The Commodore's and Vice-Commodore's ships, rescue ships, merchant aircraft carriers, and ships fitted with Huff Duff were fitted when possible for intercommunication with other escort vessels.

After the war, captured records showed that the German Kriegsmarine Beobachtungsdienst (Signals Intelligence Service) had been reading BAMS since the start of the conflict. Rodger Winn studied the effects of ULTRA intelligence decrypts in relation to U-boat movements and realized that BAMS was clear to the Germans; in 1943 he eventually convinced the Admiralty to make the necessary revisions to BAMS.

== Description ==
The BAMS protocol was the second part of a two part communication protocol between shore to merchant ship. BAMS was for Radio communication, and the Visual signalling component, the first part was, called the: Visual Signalling Code and Instructions (WIMS-I), a publication held by the United Nations. Both BAMS and WIMS-I were essentially a safety protocol, to ensure reliable, no mistake communication.

== Shore to Ship Communication ==
The BAMS system divides the world into three zones, that are covered by a high-powered Zone station. Each zone is further sectioned with an Area station per section. Within a zone, multiple stations synchronize using Spread spectrum frequency radio to provide complete coverage. Image one called: BAMS Zones of Operation has a clear description, of delineation of control with the Zones.

=== BAMS Delineated Zones ===
The following is an example of Area 1B. The Area 1B record provides an English description of a topographic square on the earth. The Area 1B record is record 2 of 20, and has the following format:

Area 1B
Northern limit	parallel of 43 degrees North
Southern limit	parallel of 26 degrees 10 minutes North
Eastern limit	meridian of Gibraltar
Western limit	meridian of 40 degrees West.

The Zones are numbered, Area 1A, Area 1B, 2A, 2B, 3A, 3B, 3C, 4, 5A, 5B, 5C, 5D, 6A, 6B, 6C, 7A, 7B, 7C, 8 and 9.

=== Operation ===
Zone and Area stations were configured to broadcast at routine times, on intermediate and high frequencies, with general or individual ship addressed messages, in their own zone of area, respectively. Coastal stations were utilized for the broadcast of messages to merchant ships within range, except at times when broadcast schedules within that zone are in operation. Coastal stations called on the 500 kHz frequency band, and shifted to the working frequency, for the transmission of the BAMS message.

=== Arranging Authority ===
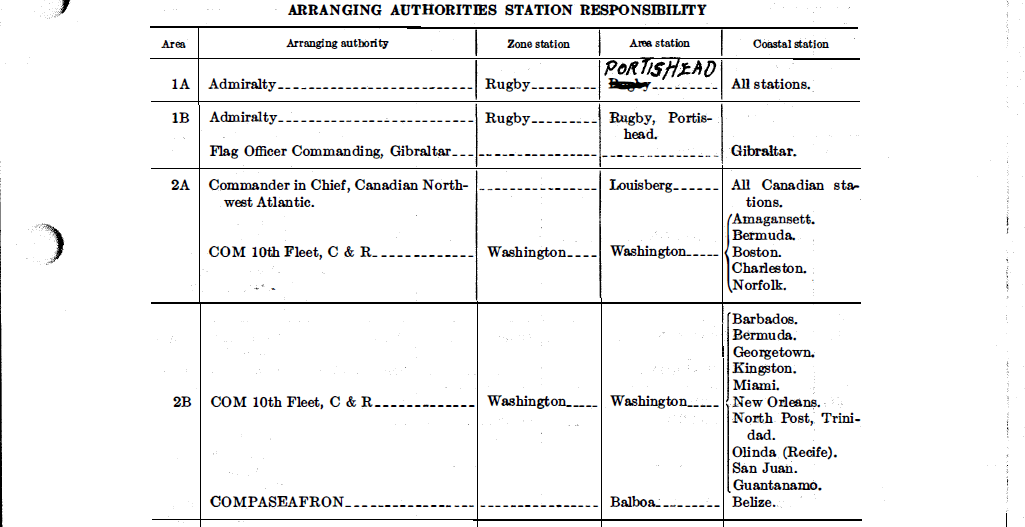
Page 1 of the Arranging Authorities List used by BAMS. The list shows the Zone, Area and Coastal stations, associated with a particular Arranging Authority.

Transmissions of messages for merchant ships via the Zone, Area or Coastal stations are arranged by certain designated shore-based Arranging Authorities (AA). These stations read the BAMS message header and route the BAMS messages, ensuring it is transmitted by correct Zone and Area stations assigned to them, and by Coastal stations if required. The Arranging Authority also ensures that Coastal stations under their control, transmit messages that are considered necessary, even if the originator does not specify such a transmission.

=== Originators responsibility ===
The originator of a BAMS message is responsible for routing the message to the AA, controlling the Zone and Area stations. In addition, the originator of the BAMS message is responsible for routing to concerned authorities. Routed BAMS messages are only sent to those radio stations whose plotted position covers the area addressed in the BAMS message. An AA may need to know the content of the BAMS dispatch but doesn't require forward routing via the station under its control. In this instance, the message is addressed using the format described in Addressing, described below. In the case of general messages, the Zone and Area station at least would always be utilized and the case of individually addressed messages, the Area station and appropriate Coastal stations would always be utilized.

=== Routing ===
When ships are passing from one area to another, messages which concern them all are routed via the Area stations of both areas and via the appropriate Zone station.

=== BAMS Procedures ===
==== Operating Signals ====
In order to facilitate the handling of BAMS messages, Combined Operating Signals for worldwide use had been allocated as follows:

- QJL Pass to _________ for information only
- QLP Pass to _________ for BAMS transmitting action only
- QHX Pass to _________ for information and BAMS transmitting action.

These procedures signals were used in connection with unenciphered US Navy call signs or combined call signs as appropriate. All transmissions of BAMS messages between naval authorities must carry appropriate procedures signals except where messages are transmitted to radio stations for broadcast where no intermediate relaying station is involved.

==== BAMS Headings ====
A modified commercial procedure is utilized for the addressing of BAMS messages and immediately follows the procedure signals, radio station call signs and station serial number. Component parts of this BAMS heading would always appear in the following order:

- BAMS instructional group
- Optional inserts:

- Name or Call sign of coastal station from which transmission is desired.
- The phrase HAS BEEN BROADCAST BY ______ for the information of Arranging Authorities addressed.

- BAMS areas to which message is to be transmitted. For example, BAMS2B
- Precedence indicator in plain language (British or US designations, depending on the nationality of the originating authority.)
- Name of originator in plain language preceded by FROM.
- Group count. Example: CDE25, if encoded dispatch; CK25 if plain language includes text between BT's.

==== BAMS Instructional Group ====
The Instructional Group consists of two elements, the first and second letters should be considered together as should the third, fourth and fifth letters, as show in the following table:

First and Second letters of Group		Third, Fourth, and Fifth letters of Group	
AA	Broadcast this message (or text and time of message quoted) to _________ on zone or area broadcast routines for number of transmissions indicated.	GGG	For two transmissions
BB	Broadcast this message (or time of origin and text of message quoted) to ________ on receipt and repeat at single operator periods. Total number of transmissions to be indicated.	JJJ	For three transmissions
CC	Arrange transmission of this message (or text and time or origin of message quoted) to _________ from Zone and/or Area stations for whom you are responsible, and if Coastal stations are indicated, arrange transmissions from these stations. Number of transmissions of whether or not specific Coastal stations are indicated, and if considered necessary, arrange transmission from appropriate Coastal stations for which the sender is responsible. Note: Should the merchant ship carry less than three radio operators, the fifth letter of the BAMS instructional group was to be replaced by Y or Z which were allotted the following meanings. Y-Transmit at special single-operator periods. Z-Transmit at special two-operator periods. Originators of BAMS traffic normally possess information as to number of operators carried. If this is not known, messages should be treated as for a single operator ship.	KKK	For four transmissions
CC		LLL	For twenty-four hours.

- Convoy call signs Messages for a particular convoy or unit thereof are addressed by a two-letter group that is assigned before sailing. A different group is assigned to each convoy. This key group in conjunction with the following letter-number combinations to form convoy call signs:

Two-letter group	Convoy Call Sign
D1	Commodore
D2	Vice Commodore
D3	The whole convoy
D4	The Commodore's portion of the convoy.
D5	The Vice Commodore's portion of the convoy.
D6	The Senior Officer of the Escort
D7	
D8	
D9	Stragglers from the convoy

The following is an example: Group XY having been assigned, the call sign used to address the whole convoy is XYD3.

- Collective call signs Other than Convoy collective call signs discussed in Convoy call signs, above, utilize the four letters BAMS followed by a BAMS area designation if appropriate.

The following is an example:

BAMS - All United Nations Merchant Ships
BAMS 2A - All United Nations Merchant Ships in BAMS AREA 2A

- Individual call signs A United Nations merchant ship is individually addressed by its wartime radio call sign.

==== Addressing BAMS traffic ====
The following lists several examples of BAMS traffic addressing.

- The authority originating a BAMS message, addresses it as appropriate, in accordance with the foregoing and transmits it to an Arranging Authorities, and/or radio stations concerned. The following is an example:

A BAMS message is originated by Commander, Tenth Fleet (Convoy and Routing) and transmitted to Commander, Panama Sea Frontier, for the information of the latter authority and for transmission via the Area station controlled by him:

NBA V NSS NR10――QHX――JOPE――CCGGG BAMS2B STOP BAMS2B BAMS2B PRIORITY FROM COM 10TH FLEET CDE141 BT TEXT BT 171216Z

- If broadcast by specific Coastal stations is desired by the originator, the call sign of stations or name in plain language should be inserted following the five-letter BAMS instructional group. The following is an example:

A BAMS message is originated by Commander, Tenth Fleet (Convoy and Routing), transmitted to Commander, Panama Sea Frontier, for BAMS transmission via the Area station, controlled by the latter, and, in addition, for transmission via Coastal station at Belize, message not for information of Commander, Panama Sea Frontier.

NBA V NSS NR6――QLP――JOPE――CCGGC VPP (OR RADIO BELIZE) BAMS2B STOP KFCG KFCG PRIORITY FROM COM 10TH FLEET CDE 51 BT TEXT BT 081111Z

The Commander, Panama Sea Frontier will arrange transmission on Naval Radio Balboa Area broadcast, and in addition will transmit to Radio Belize for broadcast at other than scheduled times. The BAMS instructional group must be changed to AAGGG when the message is passed to Radio Balboa and to BBGGG for Radio Belize. The Procedure signal is omitted in the transmission to Radio Belize as complete instructions for that station are included in the BAMS instructional group.

- Originating authorities should not normally pass messages directly to Coastal stations for transmission, but if it done, originators must indicate to the authority arranging the area transmission what action to take. The indication will be in plain language, immediately after the five-letter BAMS instructional group. The following is an example:

A BAMS message is originated by the Commander; Panama Sea Frontier, transmittedvia Naval Racilio Guantanamo for broadcast and to Commander, Tenth Fleet (Convoy and Routing), for information only.

Transmission to Radio San Juan for relay to Radio Guantanamo:

NAU V NBA NR6――QLP――NAW――BBGGG BAMS2B STOP WXYZ WXYZ PRIOROTY FROM COMPASEAFRON CDE17 BT TEXT BT 141411Z

Transmission from Radio San Juan to Radio Guantanamo:

NAW V NAU NR2 BBGGG BAMS2B STOP WXYZ WXYZ PRIORITY FROM COMPASEAFRON CDE BT TEXT BT 111611Z

Transmission to COM 10th Fleet:

NSS V NBA NR7――QJL――TUBA――CCGGG HAS BEEN BROADCAST BY NAW BAMS2B STOP WXYZ WXYZ PRIORITY FROM COMPASEAFRON CDE17 BT TEXT BT 141611Z

Inasmuch as the first two letters of the BAMS instructional group, CC, are normally employed when addressing an Arranging Authority, CCGGG is used in the example of the transmission to COM 1Oth Fleet.

==== Instructions to Broadcasting stations ====
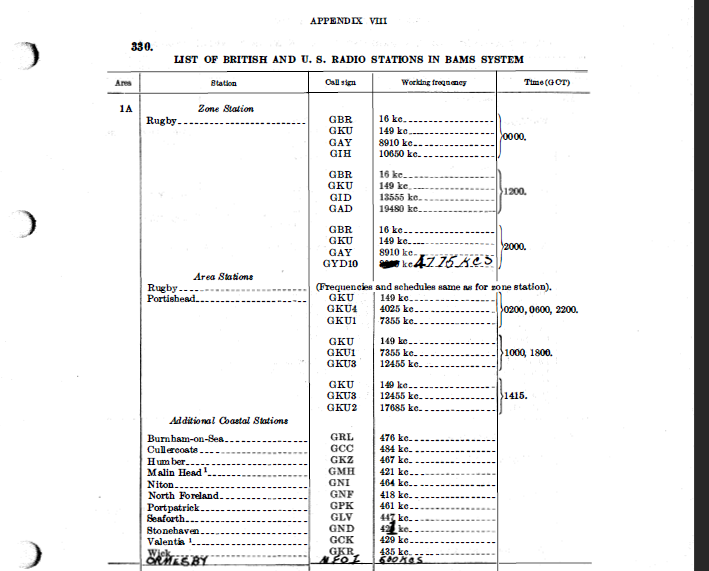
Page 1 of the Radio Stations List, used by BAMS. The list details the name of each radio station, its call signs and working frequency and time of transmission.

- Zone and Area stations

Zone and area transmit BAMS traffic at scheduled times, defined on a per station basis. Transmission speed was to be 15 words or code groups per minute, a speed of transmission selected to reduce transmission errors. If no traffic was available to transmit, Area stations transmitted their call letters and the International Operating Signal QRU for a period of less than 5 minutes. Traffic lists precede zone and area broadcast schedules and consist of Call signs, that were transmitted twice, and groups of messages ordered by date and time, were transmitted in sequence. Traffic was broadcast in the following sequence:

- Messages addressed to collective call signs in order:

- Zone call signs
- Area call signs
- Convoy call signs, in alphabetical sequence.

- Messages addressed by individual call signs in alphabetical sequence.

The makeup of the traffic list was of great importance, as it told the merchantmen what messages were to be addressed to them. Ships were permitted to discontinue covering BAMS schedules once they received messages addressed to them. Zone and Area stations transmitted messages in the sequence indicated by the traffic lists, with each message being preceded by the call sign of the addressee that was transmitted twice. Each message is transmitted once through completion of the transmission of all messages indicated in the traffic list, new messages were repeated in the same sequence as they were broadcast at the first transmission. In the event that a BAMS message of higher precedence than standard routine messages was needing to be sent, it was only sent if the Zone and Area stations could insert the message in the correct order in the traffic lists being broadcast by the Zone and Area stations.

The BAMS instructions groups are sloughed off the message when in transmission by broadcasting station.

BAMS2B BAMS2B DE NSS BT BAMS2B BAMS2B PRIORITY FROM COM 10TH FLEET CDE20 BT TEXT BT 161217Z

- Coastal stations

These stations will broadcast BAMS messages upon receipt, if the zone of area schedule was not in progress, or about to start. In in progress, the Coastal station went into wait mode, until the transmission was completed. Coastal stations transmittd on 500 kHz, transmitted call signs and date and time groups of messages, shifting the frequency by international Q signal to the working frequencies, and waiting for 2 minutes before transmitting the messages. The 2-minute pause was to enable the Coastal stations to transmit their call letters on their working frequency. The BAMS instruction group is used to define how many times transmission of the message was repeated, sometimes with an interval period. If more than one BAMS message were to be transmitted by the Coastal station, messages were then transmitted in sequences, as per the Zone and Area station.

==== Correction of BAMS messages ====
Occasionally a BAMS message needed to be corrected. In this instance, a new enciphered message was created, and dispatched using the same instruction group. Corrections to errors in transmission of code groups took the form of a new plain language dispatch containing appropriate instructions regarding the changes.

MY 171025 CORRECT GROUP 3 5 AND 6 TO READ 54219 17254 33172 BT 171834Z
