= Slidex =

Paper based encryption system, used in the American civil war

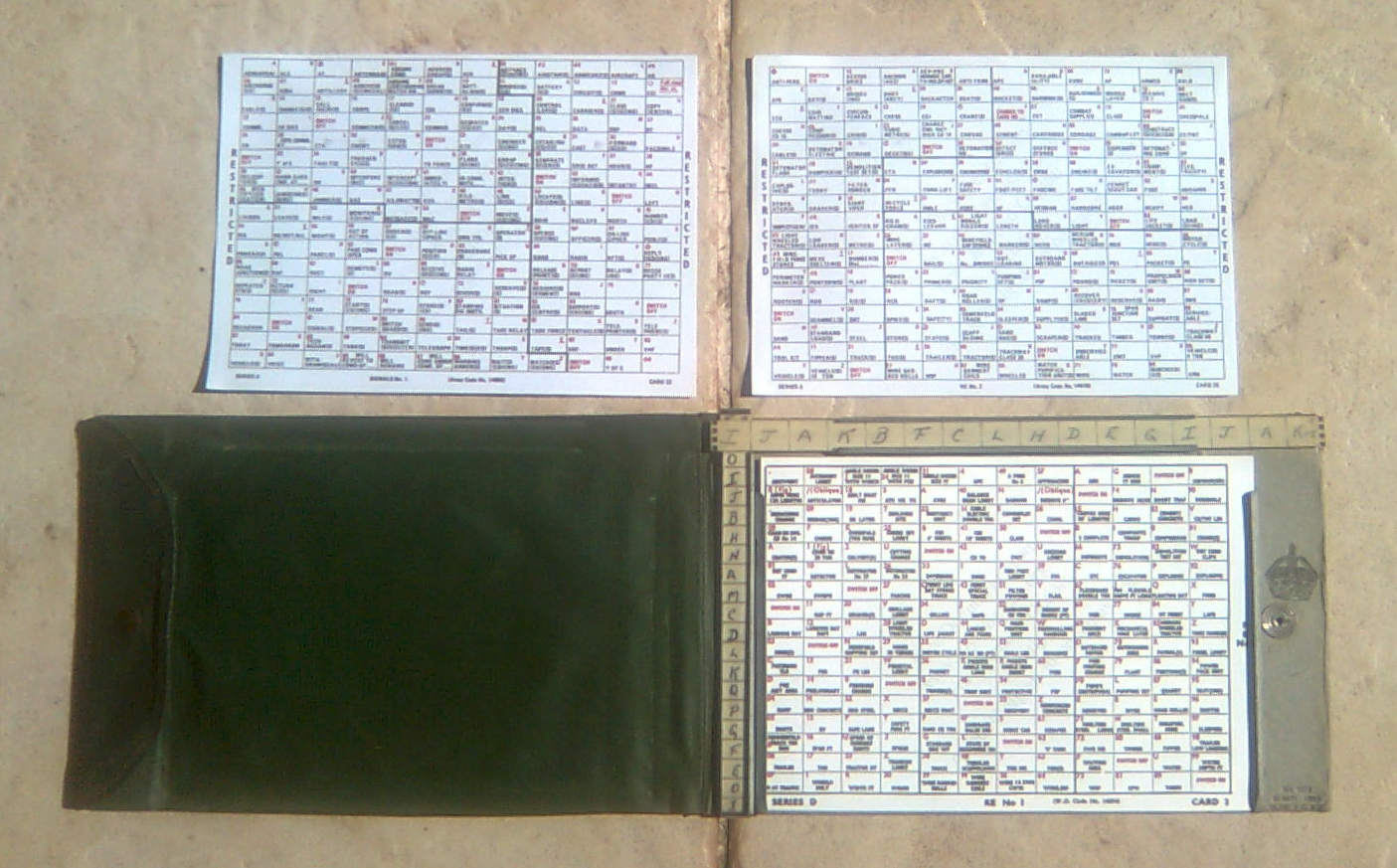
A Slidex, bearing a date 12/43, with one vocabulary card and code strips in place, and two more different cards

Slidex was a hand-held, paper-based encryption system used at a low, front line (platoon, troop and section) level in the British Army during the Second World War and later the Cold War period. It was replaced by the BATCO tactical code, which, in turn has been largely made obsolete by the Bowman secure voice radios.

== Design ==
Slidex used a series of vocabulary cards arranged in a grid of 12 rows and 17 columns. Each of the 204 resulting cells has a word or phrase, as well as a letter or number. The latter allowed the system to spell out words and transmit numbers.

The cards were stored in a folding case that had a pair of cursors to facilitate locating cells. Messages were encrypted and decrypted using code strips that could be placed in holder along the top and left side of the vocabulary card. Blank vocabulary cards were provided to allow units to create a word set for a specific mission.

== See also ==
- Encryption algorithm
- Military intelligence
