= Eiche (Potsdam) =

- Ortsteil of Potsdam
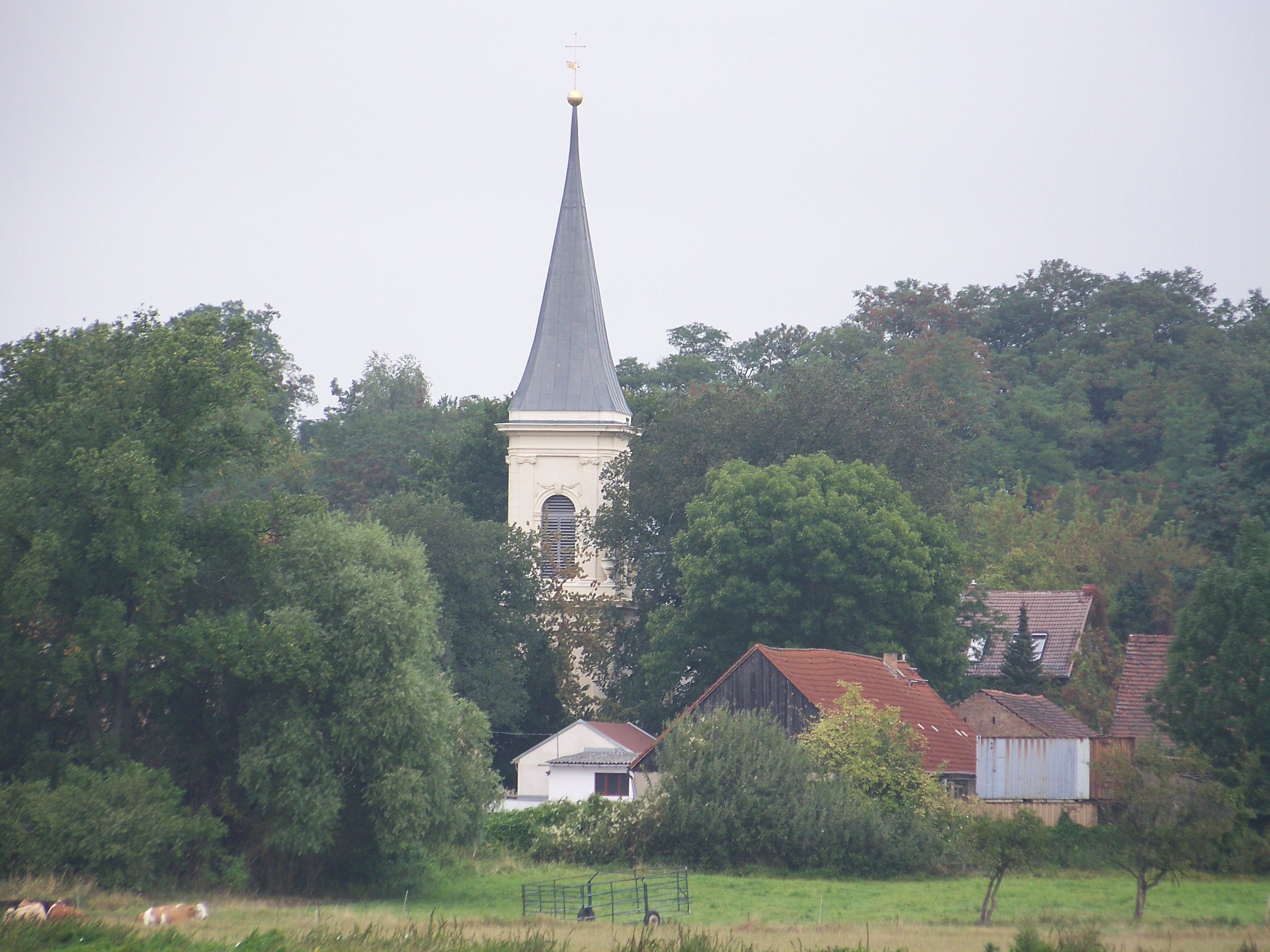
- Village church
- Interactive map of Eiche
- Location within Germany Location within Brandenburg
- Coordinates: 52°24′17″N 12°59′26″E
- Country: Germany
- State: Brandenburg
- District: Potsdam
- City: Potsdam
- Elevation: 37 m (121 ft)

Population (2008-12-31)
  - Total: 4,480
- Time zone: UTC+01:00 (CET)
  - Summer (DST): UTC+02:00 (CEST)
- Postal codes: 14469
- Dialling codes: 0331
- Vehicle registration: P

Eiche (German pronunciation: [ˈaɪçə]) is a locality (Ortsteil) of Potsdam with 4480 inhabitants (2008). It was incorporated into the city of Potsdam in 1993.

== Geography ==
Eiche is situated about 4.5 km west of Potsdam city centre on the road to Golm at the foot of several hills, among them Großer Herzberg (73 m a.s.l) north of the village, Kleiner Herzberg (67 m a.s. l.) and Kahler Berg (66 m a.s.l.) to the east and Ehrenpfortenberg (55 m a.s.l) to the west. Neighbouring places are Golm in the west, Bornim in the north, Bornstedt in the east, and Wildpark in the south, all of them are districts of Potsdam.

== History ==
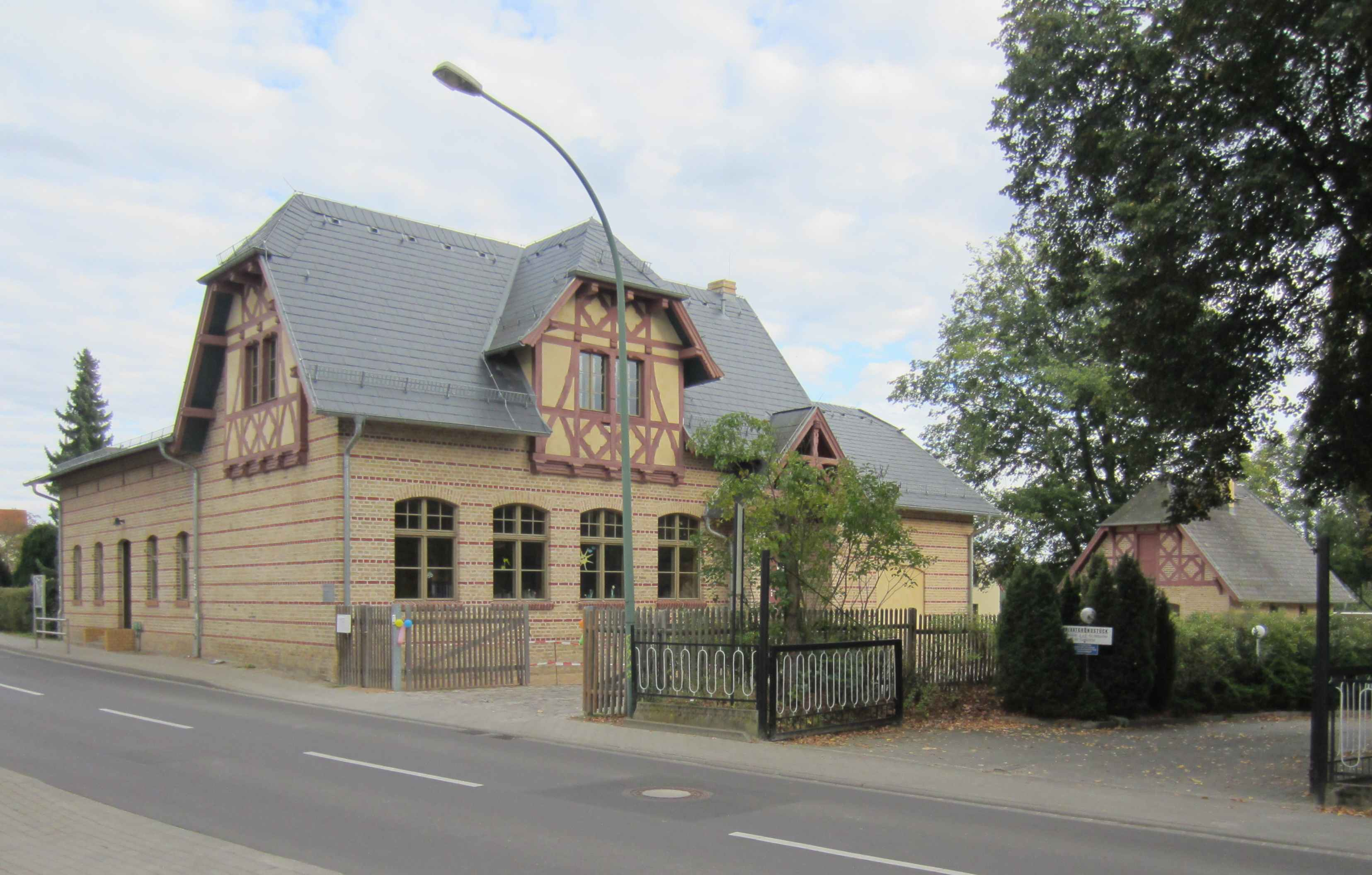
Former village school (listed building)

Eiche was first mentioned in a document dating from 1193. Until the substantial extensions starting in 1881, it remained a linear settlement. A new church in neo-classical style was built in 1771 on orders from Frederick the Great to plans by the architect Georg Christian Unger. Until 1935 the village was part of Osthavelland district. On 1 August 1935 it was incorporated into the city of Potsdam, on 25 July 1952 it was split off again in order to join neighbouring Golm in the joint municipality Eiche-Golm in Potsdam-Land district. On 1 January 1962 this municipality was split in its constituent parts, making Eiche an independent municipality again until it was re-incorporated into Potsdam on 6 December 1993. A new residential quarter was built in the 1990s on the fields of Altes Rad north of the village.

=== Police barracks ===
Barracks built on today's Kaiser-Friedrich-Straße in 1890/1891 housed initially an infantry training battalion. In the era of the Weimar Republic the buildings were used by the Prussian higher police school which educated officer candidates for the Schutzpolizei. In 1935 the barracks were transferred to the German air force, and from 1936 on they were rebuilt after a standardised design as a school for non-commissioned officers. The main buildings are still standing.

In the era of the GDR the barracks were first used by Kasernierte Volkspolizei, later by Volkspolizei-Bereitschaft, in particular the counter-terrorist unit Diensteinheit IX. Now units and facilities of the police of the state of Brandenburg are using the premises.

=== Military barracks ===
From 1935 to 1938 further barracks were built for the German air force, also after a standardised design. While police officer candidates were initially also taught there, the courses and their participants were transferred to the air force from late 1935. After the death of lieutenant general Walther Wever in an airplane crash near Dresden on 3 June 1936, the barracks were named after him. The major part of the espionage and counter-espionage department of the German military intelligence service moved here after bomb damages to its Berlin central in April 1943. From 1956, Nationale Volksarmee used the premises which extend across Ehrenpfortenberg hill until today's campus of Potsdam university in Golm where the MfS college was located from 1951 to 1990. Today, these barracks are named Havellandkaserne and are used by Bundeswehr.
