= BATCO =

British paper cryptographic system

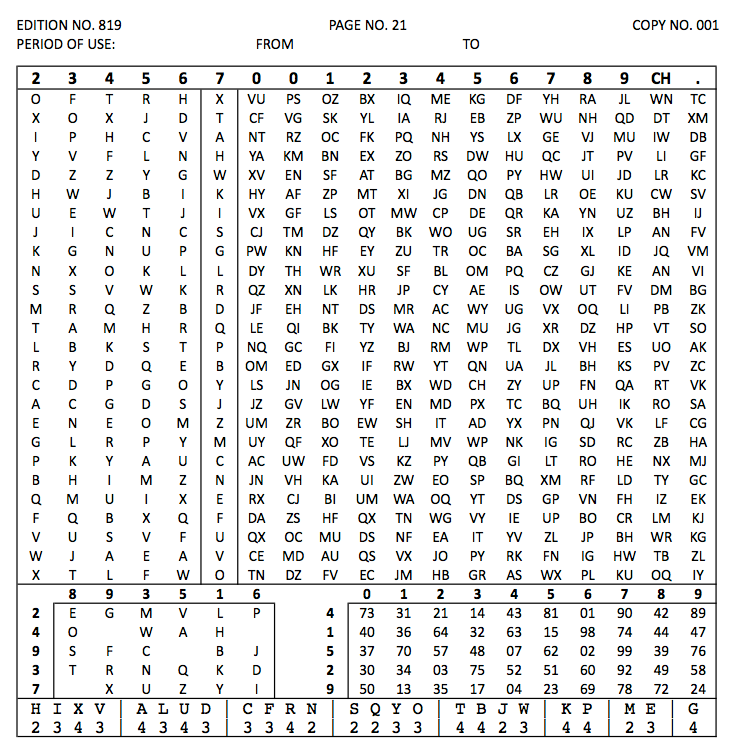
Facsimile of a BATCO cipher sheet.

BATCO, short for Battle Code, is a hand-held, paper-based encryption system used at a low, front line (platoon, troop and section) level in the British Army. It was introduced along with the Clansman combat net radio in the early 1980s and was largely obsolete by 2010 due to the wide deployment of the secure Bowman radios. BATCO consists of a code, contained on a set of vocabulary cards, and cipher sheets for superencryption of the numeric code words. The cipher sheets, which are typically changed daily, also include an authentication table and a radio call sign protection system.

BATCO is similar to the older Slidex system. The use of BATCO is still taught to Royal Signals Communication Systems Operators as a back-up should secure equipment fail or be unavailable. It is also taught to Army Cadets and Combined Cadets as part of the Signal Classification qualification.

== Code ==
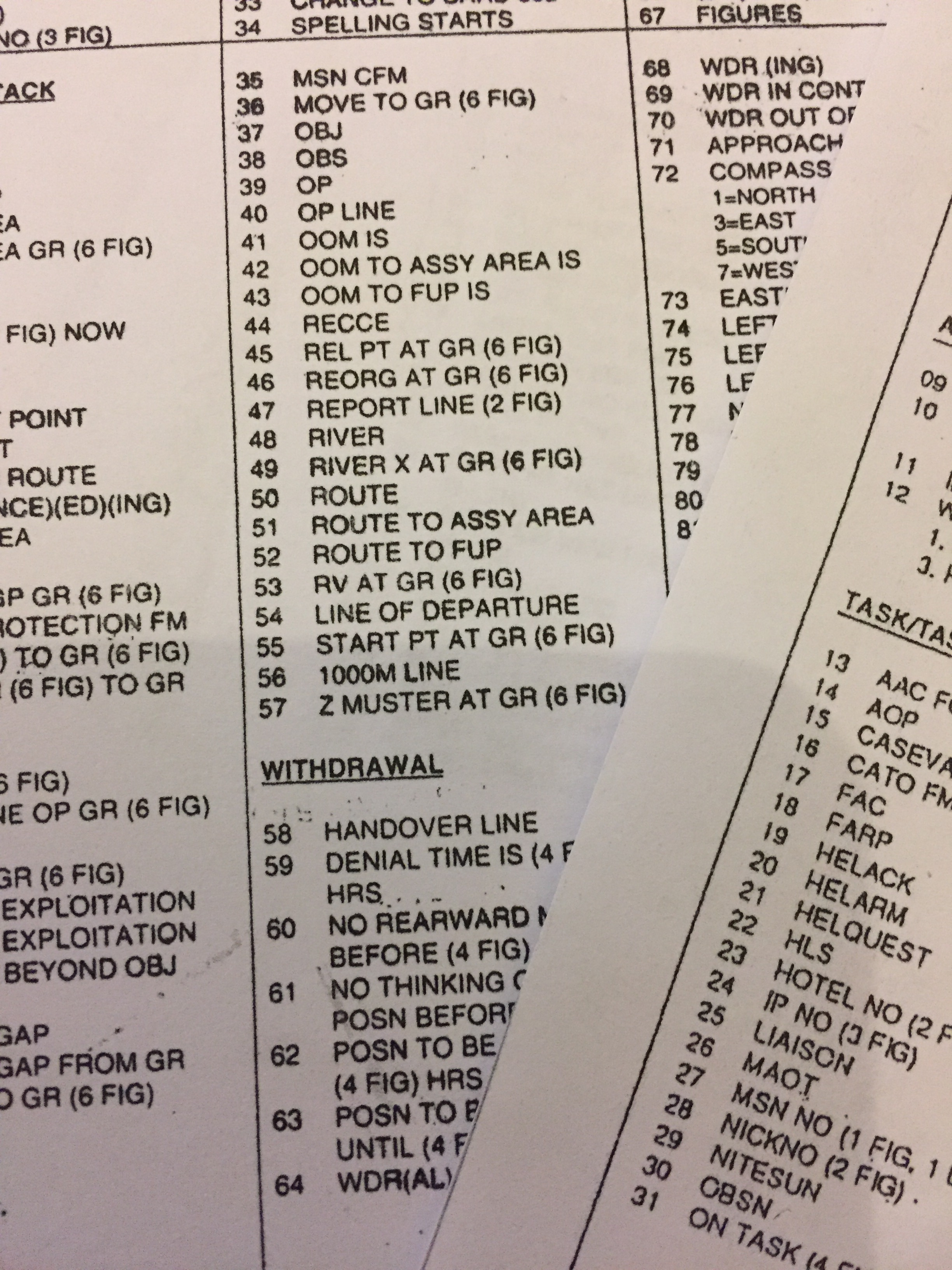
Vocabulary cards used in conjunction with British Army BATCO encryption system.

Messages in BATCO are first encoded into numbers using one of several vocabulary cards. The BATCO cipher is then used to encrypt the numbers into letters, which can be transmitted over unsecure channels. The process is reversed at the receiving end.

Each BATCO vocabulary card groups words needed for a particular function, so card changes are infrequent. Every vocabulary word on a card is assigned a two digit code. Some vocabulary card entries call for a fixed number of digits after the two digit code. For example, the code for ETA (estimated time of arrival) is followed by a four digit time of day. Each card in a set has a three digit number and there is always a code word on the card that means switch to card number xxx.

== Cipher ==
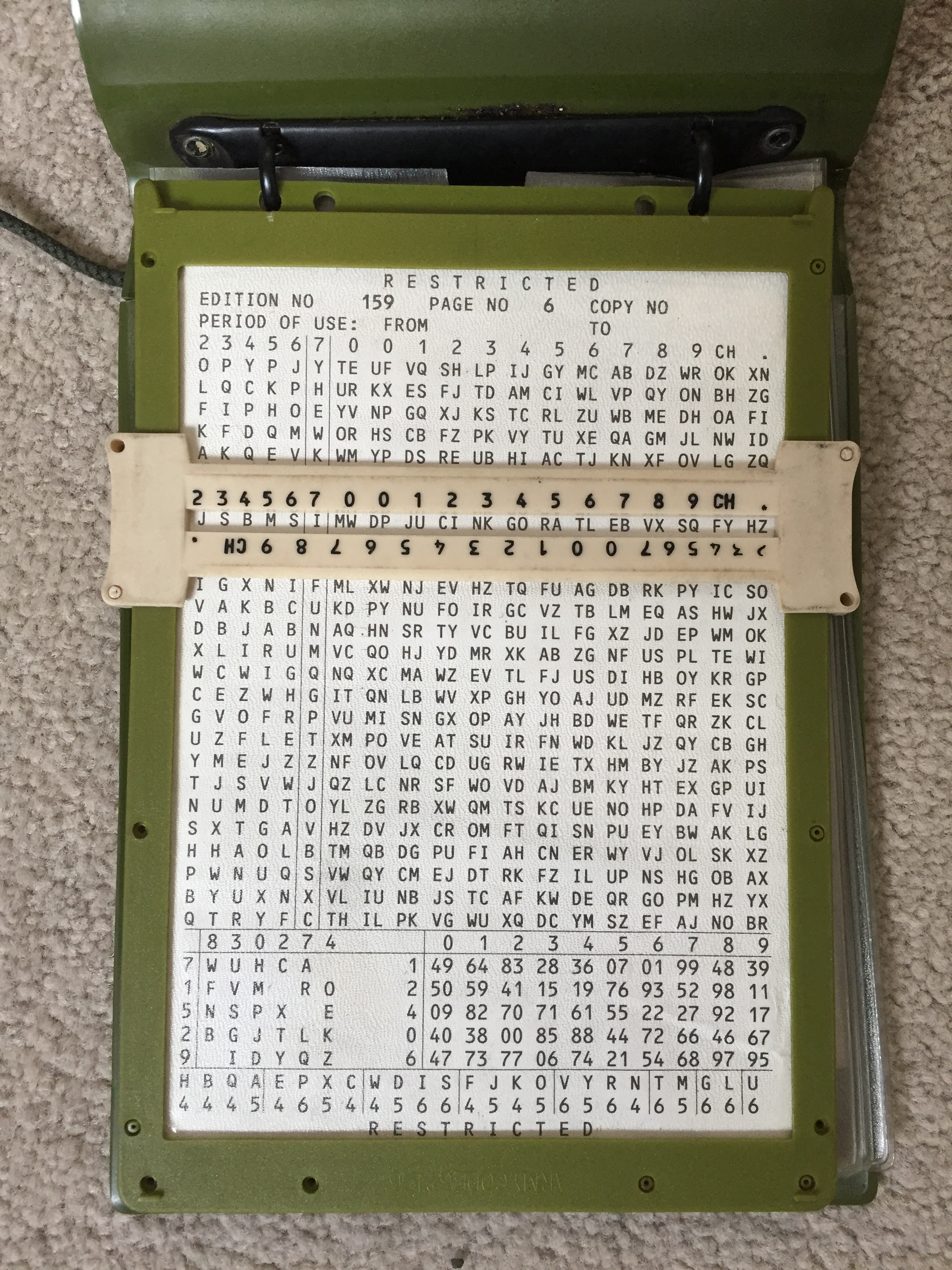
BATCO Wallet plastic insert with slider

Each BATCO cipher sheet is composed of a double-sided sheet of about A5 size that fits in a specially made BATCO wallet. Each single side is usually valid for 24 hours. The wallet has a slide that aids in reading the tables correctly.

The plaintext character set in BATCO consists of 12 symbols, the digits 0 to 9, the decimal point and a "change" character denoted as CH. The BATCO ciphertext character set is the letters A through Z. BATCO can also be used to transmit numeric information, such as grid coordinates. Switching to this mode is accomplished by sending the vocabulary code for an appropriate proword, such as FIGURES or GRID. The decimal point plaintext character is used as needed in numeric mode, having its normal meaning. The CH symbol is used to mark the end of a numeric string transmission, returning to the vocabulary card codes.

The main BATCO cipher table is a matrix of 19 columns and 26 rows. The columns are divided into two groups. The six left columns are numbered 2 through 7. The column under each digit contains a randomly scrambled alphabet. The right 13 columns are labeled 0, 0, 1, 2, 3, 4, 5, 6, 7, 8, 9, CH, ".", i.e. the plaintext symbols with 0 repeated. Each row in the right columns set contains a scrambled alphabet, with two letters in each cell. (There are 13 columns, so two letters per cell exhausts the alphabet.)

A traffic key consists of a digit (from 2 to 7) and a letter. The operator selects one of the first 6 columns using the key digit and then finds the row in which the key letter occurs. That row in the second set of columns is used to encipher and decipher BATCO messages. The scrambled alphabet in the selected row defines the correspondence between plaintext symbols in the column headings and ciphertext symbols in the individual cells. Note that there are two possible ciphertexts for each plaintext symbol, except for 0, which has four possible ciphertexts. BATCO users are instructed to choose different ciphertext symbols when the same plaintext symbol repeats in a message.

Security is maintained by frequent key changes. BATCO instructions require a new key for every message and that no more than 22 symbols should be encoded with a single key. Keys are rotated in alphabetical order, so key 5F would be followed by 5G. Key column 7 is kept in reserve for emergencies.

== Other functions ==
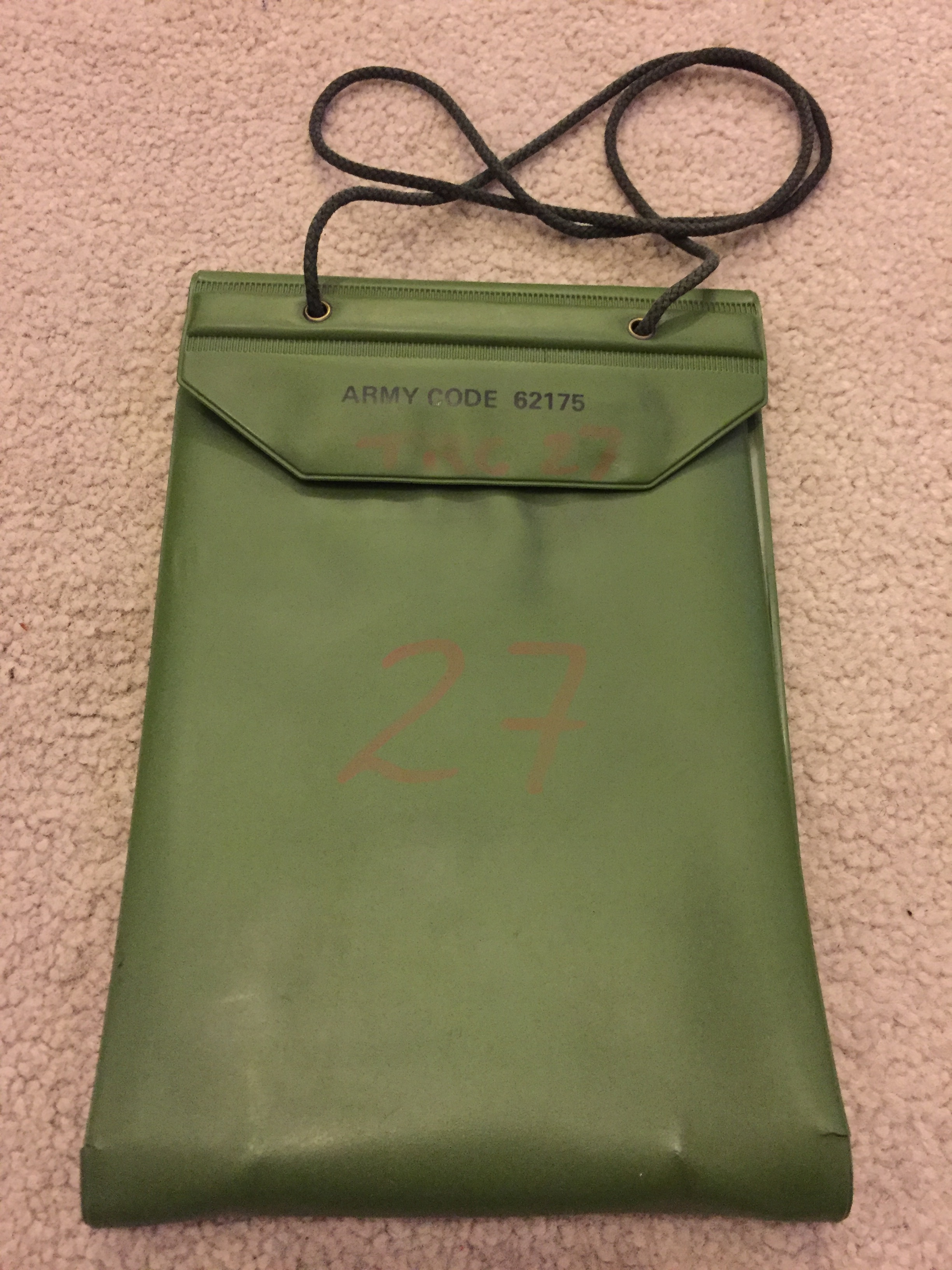
British army 1980's paper based code system wallet.

In addition to the cipher, each BATCO sheet has a:

- Spelling box
- Authentication table
- Callsign Indicator chart

The spelling box converts letters into two digit numbers which can then be encoded using the procedure described above. It is used in special situations to spell out words that are sensitive and are not on any of the vocabulary cards. The spelling box is a 6 column by 5 row matrix labeled horizontally and vertically with single digits. The matrix contains a scrambled alphabet and four blank cells.

The authentication table converts a two digit challenge number into a two digit response. It is a 10 by 5 grid, also labeled horizontally and vertically with single digits. Each cell contains a random two digit number, with no repeated cells. A challenge is issued as a two digit number specifying the columns and row that selects a cell in the table. The response is the contents of the cell.

A final scrambled alphabet at the bottom of the cipher sheet is used for a call sign scrambling system.

== See also ==
- DRYAD - a similar paper based tactical cipher used by the United States military
- Trench code
