= List of things named after Emmy Noether =

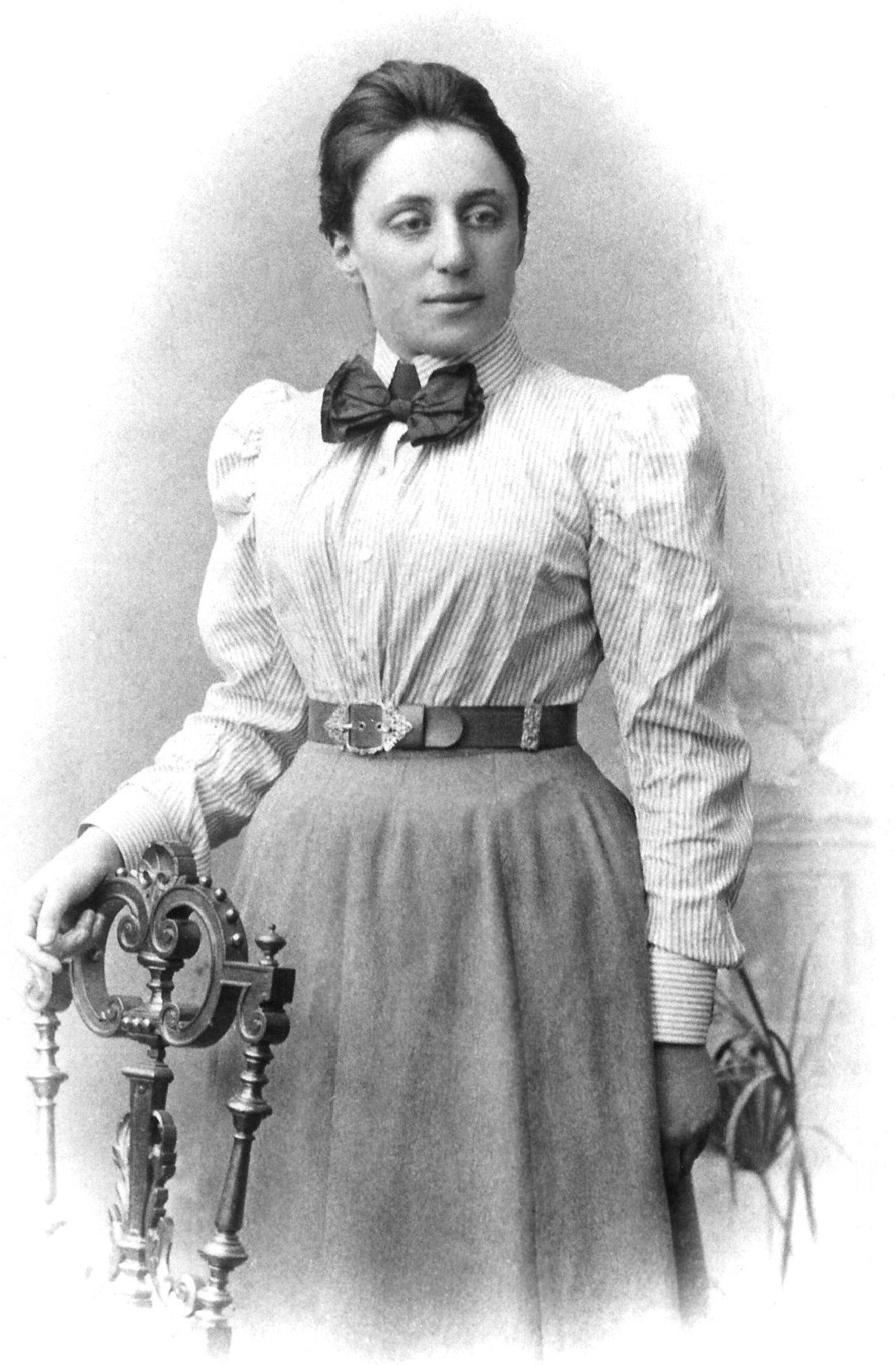
Emmy Noether before 1910

Emmy Noether (1882–1935) was a German mathematician who made many important contributions to abstract algebra. This article is dedicated to the things named after her achievements.

== Mathematics ==
- Albert–Brauer–Hasse–Noether theorem
- Lasker–Noether theorem
- Noether identities
- Noether normalization lemma
- Noether's bound
- Noether's isomorphism theorems
- Noether’s problem
- Noether's second theorem
- Noether's theorem
- Noether Current
- Noether Charge
- Skolem–Noether theorem

=== "Noetherian" ===
- Noetherian
- Noetherian group
- Noetherian induction
- Noetherian module
- Noetherian ring
- Noetherian scheme
- Noetherian topological space

== Other ==
- "Noether boys", nickname for her doctoral students.
- Noether Lecture held every year, by the Association for Women in Mathematics.
- Emmy Noether Campus, the building used by University of Siegen to house its mathematics and physics departments.
- Emmy Noether Programme, operated by the German Research Foundation (Deutsche Forschungsgemeinschaft).
- A street in her hometown, Erlangen, has been named after Emmy Noether and her father, Max Noether.
- A street in Moosach, North-West Munich, has been named after her.
- Emmy Noether School, in Erlangen.
- Emmy Noether High School Mathematics Days, series of high school workshops and competitions.
- Emmy Noether Visiting Fellowships, at the Perimeter Institute for Theoretical Physics
- LMS Emmy Noether Fellowships, at the London Mathematical Society
- The Emmy Noether Council, also at the Perimeter Institute.
- The Emmy Noether Mathematics Institute in the Department of Mathematics and Computer Science, Bar-Ilan University, Ramat Gan, Israel - jointly founded by the university, the German government and the Minerva Foundation.
- The Emmy Noether lectures (an annual series of distinguished lectures).
- Emmy Nutter, the (fictional) physics professor in "The God Patent" by Ransom Stephens, is based on Emmy Noether.

=== Astronomy ===
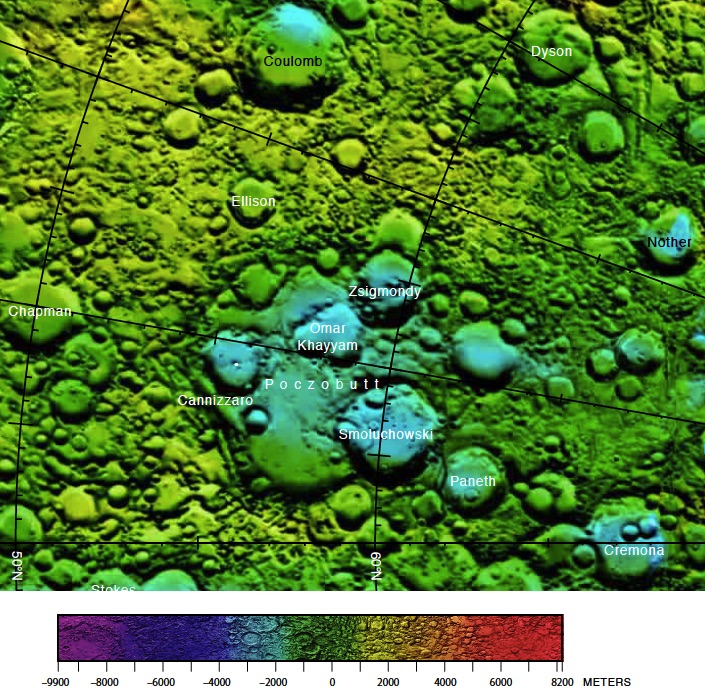
Part of the USGS far side lunar chart

- The crater Nöther on the far side of the Moon is named after her.
- The 7001 Noether asteroid also is named for her.

== Sources ==
- Noether, Gottfried E. (1987), Grinstein, L.S.; Campbell, P.J. (eds.), Women of Mathematics, New York: Greenwood Press, ISBN 978-0-313-24849-8
- Schmadel, Lutz D. (2003), Dictionary of Minor Planet Names (5th revised and enlarged ed.), Berlin: Springer-Verlag, ISBN 978-3-540-00238-3
