= Emmy Noether =

German mathematician (1882–1935)

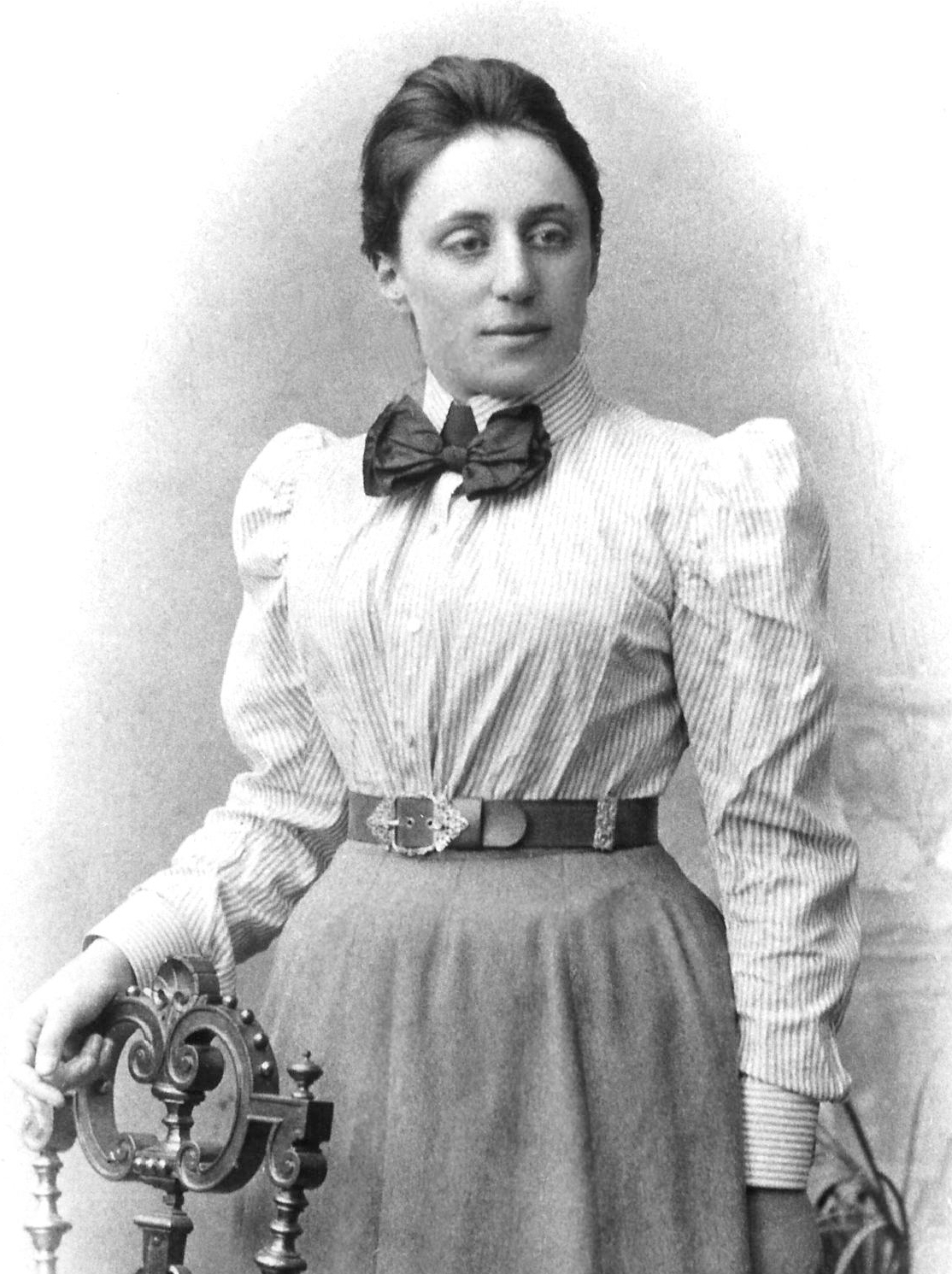
- Noether c. 1900–1910
- Born: Amalie Emmy Noether; 23 March 1882; Erlangen, Kingdom of Bavaria, German Empire
- Died: 14 April 1935 (aged 53); Bryn Mawr, Pennsylvania, US
- Education: University of Erlangen–Nuremberg (PhD); University of Göttingen (Hab.)
- Known for: Abstract algebra; Noether's theorem; Noetherian; List of namesakes
- Father: Max Noether
- Awards: Ackermann–Teubner Memorial Award (1932)
- Scientific career
- Fields: Mathematics, physics
- Workplaces: University of Göttingen; Bryn Mawr College
- Thesis: Über die Bildung des Formensystems der ternären biquadratischen Form (On Complete Systems of Invariants for Ternary Biquadratic Forms) (1907)
- Doctoral advisor: Paul Gordan
- Doctoral students: Max Deuring; Hans Fitting; Grete Hermann; Jacob Levitzki; Otto Schilling; Chiungtze C. Tsen; Werner Weber; Ernst Witt

Amalie Emmy Noether (Note: German: [ˈnøːtɐ]) (Note: Emmy is the Rufname, the second of two official given names, intended for daily use. This can be seen in the résumé submitted by Noether to the University of Erlangen–Nuremberg in 1907. Sometimes Emmy is mistakenly reported as a short form for Amalie, or misreported as Emily; for example, the latter was used by Lee Smolin in a letter for The Reality Club.) (23 March 1882 – 14 April 1935) was a German mathematician who made many important contributions to abstract algebra and mathematical physics. As one of the leading mathematicians of her time, she developed theories of rings, fields, and algebras. She also proved Noether's first and second theorems, which play a fundamental role in mathematical physics, by explaining the connection between symmetry and conservation laws.

Noether was born to a Jewish family in the Franconian town of Erlangen; her father was the mathematician Max Noether. She originally planned to teach French and English after passing the required examinations, but instead studied mathematics at the University of Erlangen–Nuremberg, where her father lectured. After completing her doctorate in 1907 under the supervision of Paul Gordan, she worked at the Mathematical Institute of Erlangen without pay for seven years. At the time, women were largely excluded from academic positions. In 1915, David Hilbert and Felix Klein invited her to join the mathematics department at the University of Göttingen, a world-renowned center of mathematical research. The philosophical faculty objected, and she spent four years lecturing under Hilbert's name. Her habilitation was approved in 1919, allowing her to obtain the rank of Privatdozent.

Noether remained a leading member of the Göttingen mathematics department until 1933; her students were sometimes called the "Noether Boys". In 1924, Dutch mathematician B. L. van der Waerden joined her circle and soon became the leading expositor of Noether's ideas; her work was the foundation for the second volume of his influential 1931 textbook Moderne Algebra. By the time of her plenary address at the 1932 International Congress of Mathematicians in Zürich, her algebraic acumen was recognized worldwide. In 1933, Germany's Nazi government dismissed Jews from university positions, and Noether moved to the United States to take a position at Bryn Mawr College in Pennsylvania. There, she taught graduate and post-doctoral women including Marie Johanna Weiss and Olga Taussky-Todd. At the same time, she lectured and conducted research at the Institute for Advanced Study in Princeton, New Jersey.

Noether's mathematical work has been divided into three "epochs". In the first (1908–1919), she made contributions to the theories of algebraic invariants and number fields. Noether's theorem, a result in differential invariants in the calculus of variations, has been called "one of the most important mathematical theorems ever proved in guiding the development of modern physics". In the second epoch (1920–1926), she began work that "changed the face of [abstract] algebra". In her classic 1921 paper Idealtheorie in Ringbereichen (Theory of Ideals in Ring Domains), Noether developed the theory of ideals in commutative rings into a tool with wide-ranging applications. She made elegant use of the ascending chain condition, and objects satisfying it are named Noetherian in her honor. In the third epoch (1927–1935), she published works on noncommutative algebras and hypercomplex numbers and united the representation theory of groups with the theory of modules and ideals. In addition to her own publications, Noether was generous with her ideas and is credited with several lines of research published by other mathematicians, even in fields far removed from her main work, such as algebraic topology. Noether was described by Pavel Alexandrov, Albert Einstein, Jean Dieudonné, Hermann Weyl, and Norbert Wiener as the most important woman in the history of mathematics.

== Biography ==
=== Early life ===
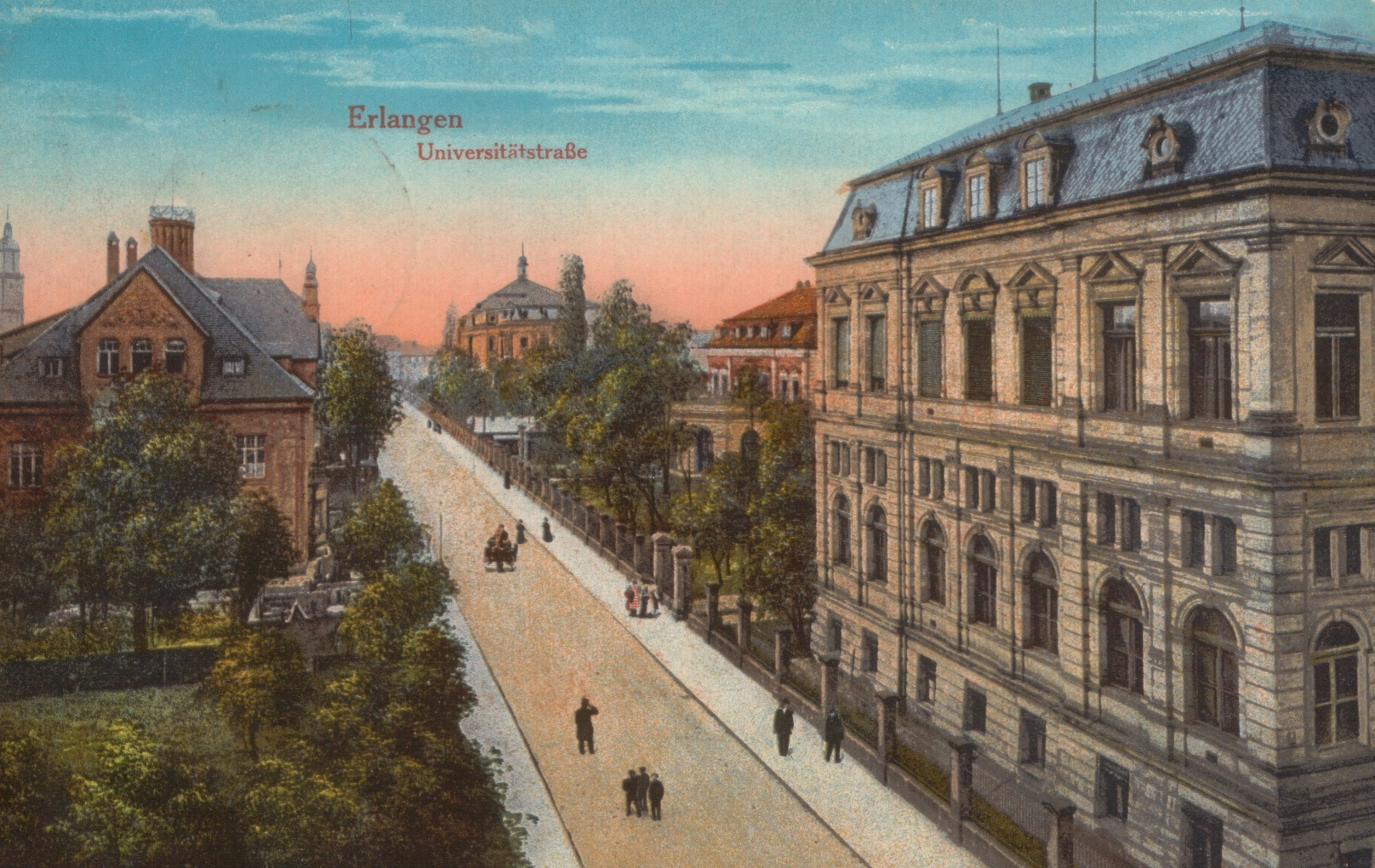
Noether grew up in the Bavarian city of Erlangen, depicted here in a 1916 postcard.

Amalie Emmy Noether was born on 23 March 1882 in Erlangen, Bavaria. She was the first of four children of mathematician Max Noether and Ida Amalia Kaufmann, both from wealthy Jewish merchant families. Her first name was "Amalie", but she began using her middle name at a young age and continued to do so in her adult life and her publications.

In her youth, Noether did not stand out academically, but she was known for being clever and friendly. She was nearsighted and had a minor lisp during her childhood. A family friend recounted a story years later about young Noether quickly solving a brain teaser at a children's party, showing logical acumen at an early age. She was taught to cook and clean, as were most girls of the time, and took piano lessons. She pursued none of these activities with passion, but loved to dance.

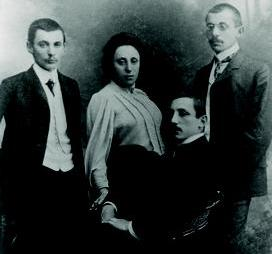
Emmy Noether with her brothers Alfred, Fritz, and Robert, before 1918

Noether had three younger brothers. The eldest, Alfred Noether, was born in 1883 and was awarded a doctorate in chemistry from Erlangen in 1909, but died nine years later. Fritz Noether was born in 1884, studied at the Ludwig-Maximilians-Universität München, and made contributions to applied mathematics. He was likely executed in the Soviet Union in 1941 during the Second World War. The youngest, Gustav Robert Noether, was born in 1889. Very little is known about his life; he suffered from chronic illness and died in 1928.

=== Education ===
Noether showed early proficiency in French and English. In 1900, she took the examination for teachers of these languages and received an overall score of sehr gut (very good). Her performance qualified her to teach languages at schools reserved for girls, but she chose instead to continue her studies at the University of Erlangen–Nuremberg, where her father was a professor.

This was an unconventional decision; two years earlier, the Academic Senate of the university had declared that allowing mixed-sex education would "overthrow all academic order". One of just two women in a university of 986 students, Noether was allowed only to audit classes rather than participate fully, and she required the permission of individual professors whose lectures she wished to attend. Despite these obstacles, on 14 July 1903 she passed the graduation exam at a Realgymnasium in Nuremberg.

During the 1903–04 winter semester, Noether studied at the University of Göttingen, attending lectures given by astronomer Karl Schwarzschild and mathematicians Hermann Minkowski, Otto Blumenthal, Felix Klein, and David Hilbert.

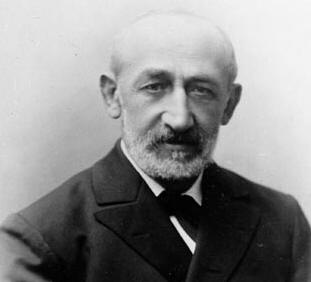
Paul Gordan supervised Noether's doctoral dissertation on invariants of biquadratic forms.

In 1903, restrictions on women's full enrollment in Bavarian universities were rescinded. Noether returned to Erlangen and officially reentered the university in October 1904, declaring her intention to focus solely on mathematics. She was one of six women in her year (two auditors) and the only woman in her chosen school. Under the supervision of Paul Gordan, she wrote her dissertation, Über die Bildung des Formensystems der ternären biquadratischen Form (On Complete Systems of Invariants for Ternary Biquadratic Forms), in 1907, graduating summa cum laude that year. Gordan was a member of the "computational" school of invariant researchers, and Noether's thesis ended with a list of over 300 explicitly worked-out invariants. This approach to invariants was later superseded by the more abstract and general approach pioneered by Hilbert. It was well received, but Noether later called her thesis and some subsequent similar papers of hers "crap". All her later work was in a completely different field.

=== University of Erlangen–Nuremberg ===
From 1908 to 1915, Noether taught at Erlangen's Mathematical Institute without pay, occasionally substituting for her father, Max Noether, when he was too ill to lecture. She joined the Circolo Matematico di Palermo in 1908 and the Deutsche Mathematiker-Vereinigung in 1909. In 1910 and 1911, she published an extension of her thesis work from three variables to n variables.

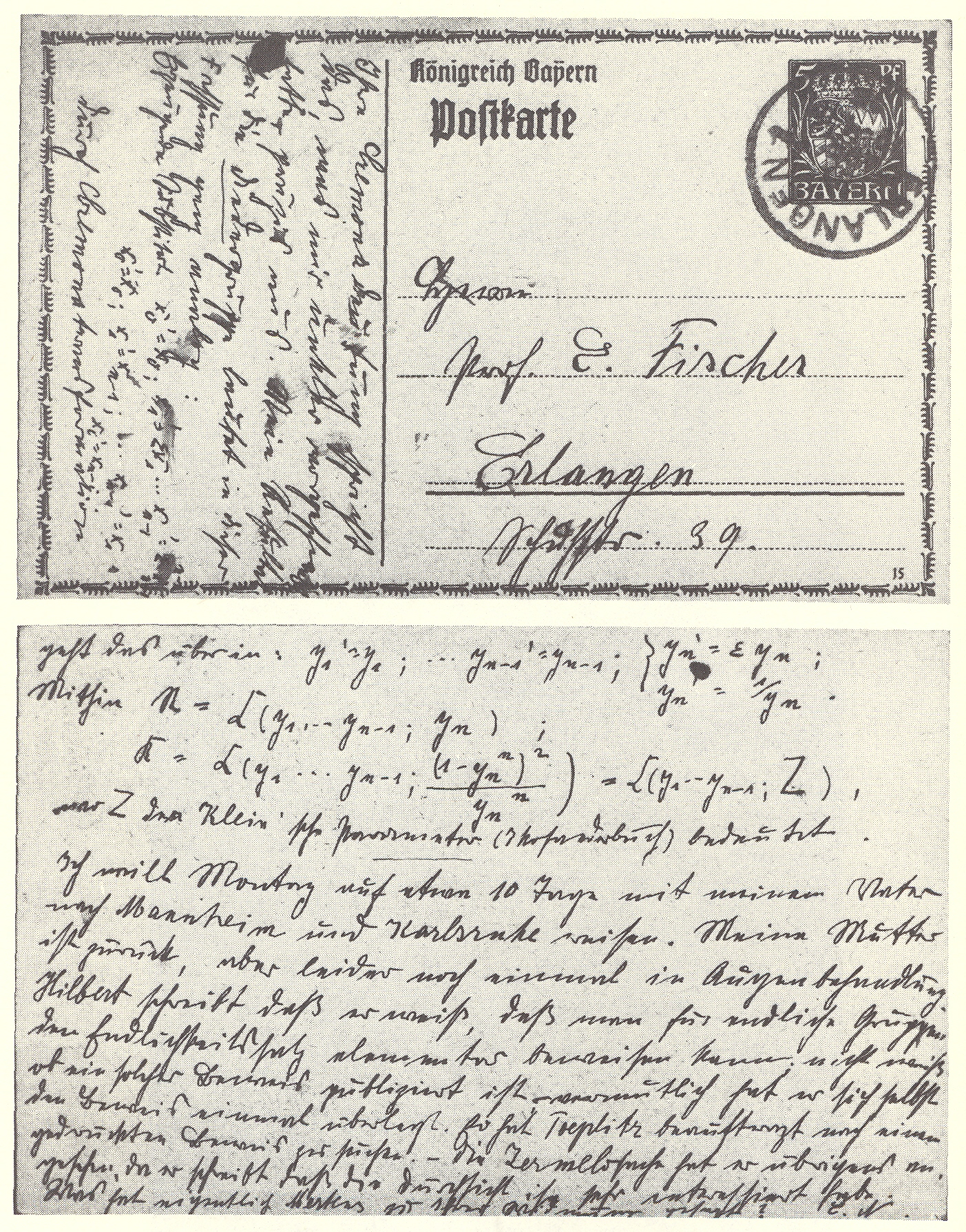
Noether sometimes used postcards to discuss abstract algebra with her colleague, Ernst Fischer. This card is postmarked 10 April 1915.

Gordan retired in 1910, and Noether taught under his successors, Erhard Schmidt and Ernst Fischer, who took over from Schmidt in 1911. According to her colleague Hermann Weyl and her biographer Auguste Dick, Fischer was an important influence on Noether, in particular by introducing her to David Hilbert's work. Noether and Fischer shared lively enjoyment of mathematics and often discussed lectures long after they were over; Noether is known to have sent Fischer postcards continuing her train of mathematical thoughts.

From 1913 to 1916, Noether published several papers extending and applying Hilbert's methods to mathematical objects such as fields of rational functions and the invariants of finite groups. This phase marked Noether's first exposure to abstract algebra, a field to which she made groundbreaking contributions.

In Erlangen, Noether advised two doctoral students: Hans Falckenberg and Fritz Seidelmann, who defended their theses in 1911 and 1916. Despite Noether's significant role, they were both officially under her father's supervision. After completing his doctorate, Falckenberg spent time in Braunschweig and Königsberg before becoming a professor at the University of Giessen. Seidelmann became a professor at the Ludwig-Maximilians-Universität München.

=== University of Göttingen ===
==== Habilitation and Noether's theorem ====
In early 1915, Noether was invited to return to the University of Göttingen by Hilbert and Felix Klein. Their effort to recruit her was initially blocked by the philologists and historians among the philosophical faculty, who insisted that women should not become privatdozenten. In a joint department meeting on the matter, one faculty member protested: "What will our soldiers think when they return to the university and find that they are required to learn at the feet of a woman?" Hilbert, who believed Noether's qualifications were the only important issue and that gender was irrelevant, objected with indignation and scolded those protesting her habilitation. His exact words have not been preserved, but his objection is often said to have included the remark that the university was "not a bathhouse". Pavel Alexandrov recalled that faculty members' opposition to Noether was based not just in sexism, but also in their objections to her social-democratic political beliefs and Jewish ancestry.

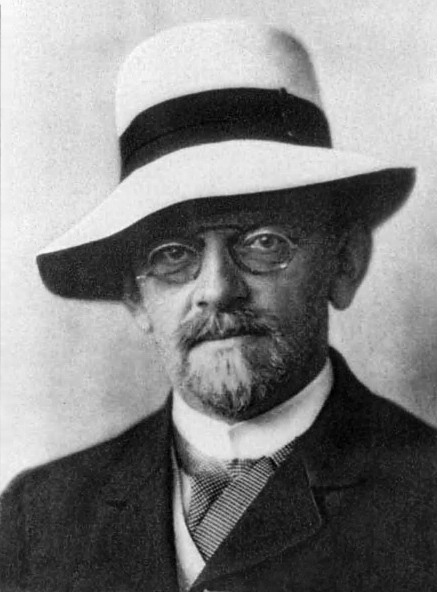
David Hilbert invited Noether to join Göttingen mathematics department in 1915, challenging the views of some of his colleagues that a woman should not teach at a university.

Noether left for Göttingen in late April; two weeks later her mother died suddenly in Erlangen. She had previously received medical care for an eye condition, but its nature and relation to her death is unknown. Around the same time, Noether's father retired and her brother joined the German Army to serve in World War I. She returned to Erlangen for several weeks, mostly to care for her aging father.

During her first years teaching at Göttingen, she had no official position and was not paid. Her lectures often were advertised under Hilbert's name, with Noether providing "assistance".

Soon after arriving at Göttingen, she demonstrated her capabilities by proving the theorems now known as Noether's theorem and Noether's second theorem; the first shows that a conservation law is associated with any differentiable symmetry of a physical system. The paper, Invariante Variationsprobleme, was presented by Felix Klein on 26 July 1918 at a meeting of the Royal Society of Sciences at Göttingen. Noether presumably did not present it herself because she was not a member of the society. In their book Symmetry and the Beautiful Universe, physicists Leon M. Lederman and Christopher T. Hill write that Noether's theorem is "certainly one of the most important mathematical theorems ever proved in guiding the development of modern physics, possibly on a par with the Pythagorean theorem".

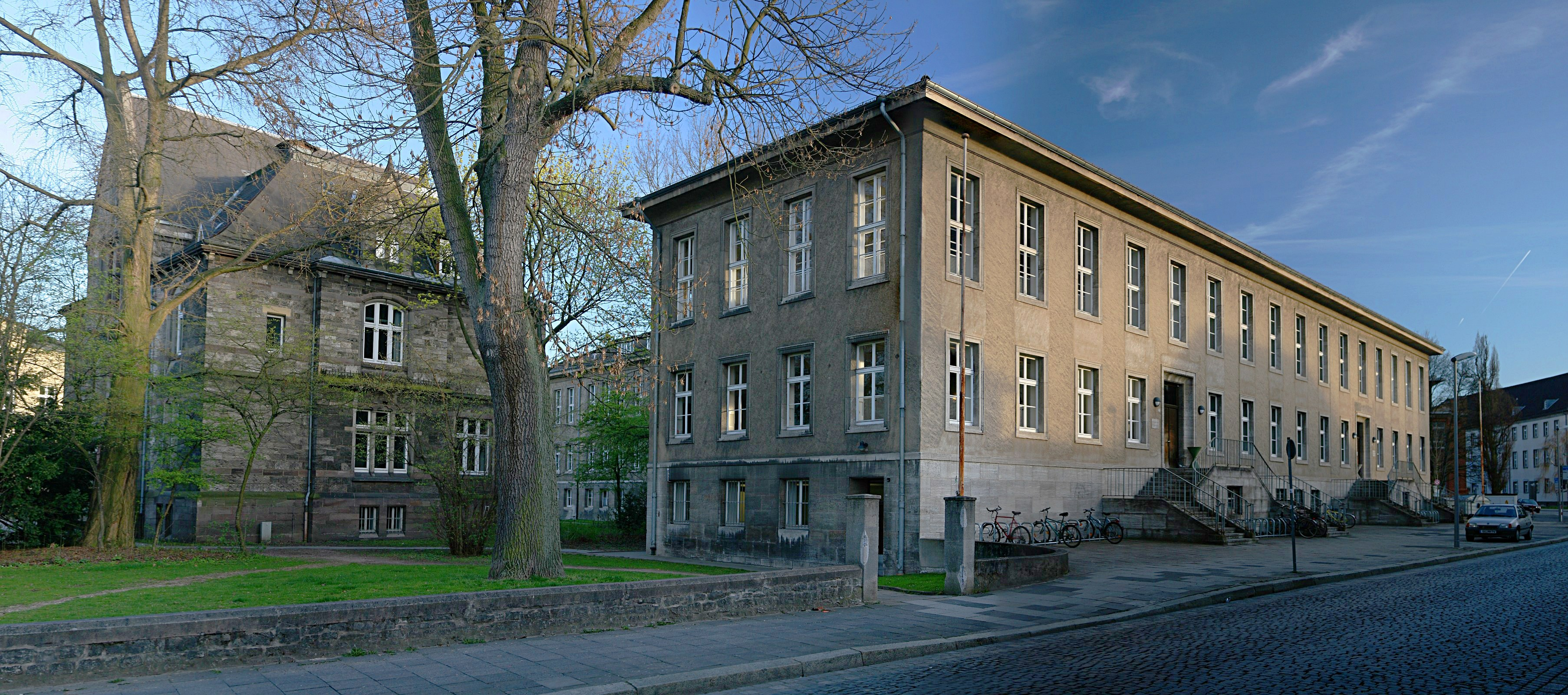
The University of Göttingen allowed Noether's habilitation in 1919, four years after she had begun lecturing at the school.

When World War I ended, the German Revolution of 1918–19 brought a significant change in social attitudes, including more rights for women. In 1919, the University of Göttingen allowed Noether to proceed with her habilitation (eligibility for tenure). Her oral examination was in May, and she successfully delivered her habilitation lecture in June. Noether became a privatdozent, and that fall delivered the first lectures listed under her name. She was still not paid for her work.

Three years later, Noether received a letter from Otto Boelitz, the Prussian Minister for Science, Art, and Public Education, in which he conferred on her the title of nicht beamteter ausserordentlicher Professor (an untenured professor with limited internal administrative rights and functions). This was an unpaid "extraordinary" professorship, not the higher "ordinary" professorship, which was a civil-service position. It recognized the importance of her work but still provided no salary. Noether was not paid for her lectures until she was appointed to the special position of Lehrbeauftragte für Algebra (Lecturer for Algebra) a year later.

==== Work in abstract algebra ====
Noether's theorem had a significant effect upon classical and quantum mechanics, but among mathematicians she is best remembered for her contributions to abstract algebra. In his introduction to Noether's Collected Papers, Nathan Jacobson wrote:

The development of abstract algebra, which is one of the most distinctive innovations of twentieth century mathematics, is largely due to her—in published papers, in lectures, and in personal influence on her contemporaries.

Noether's work in algebra began in 1920 when, in collaboration with her protégé Werner Schmeidler, she published a paper about the theory of ideals in which they defined left and right ideals in a ring.

In 1921, she published the paper Idealtheorie in Ringbereichen, analyzing ascending chain conditions with regard to (mathematical) ideals, in which she proved the Lasker–Noether theorem in its full generality. Noted algebraist Irving Kaplansky called this work "revolutionary". The publication gave rise to the term Noetherian for objects that satisfy the ascending chain condition.

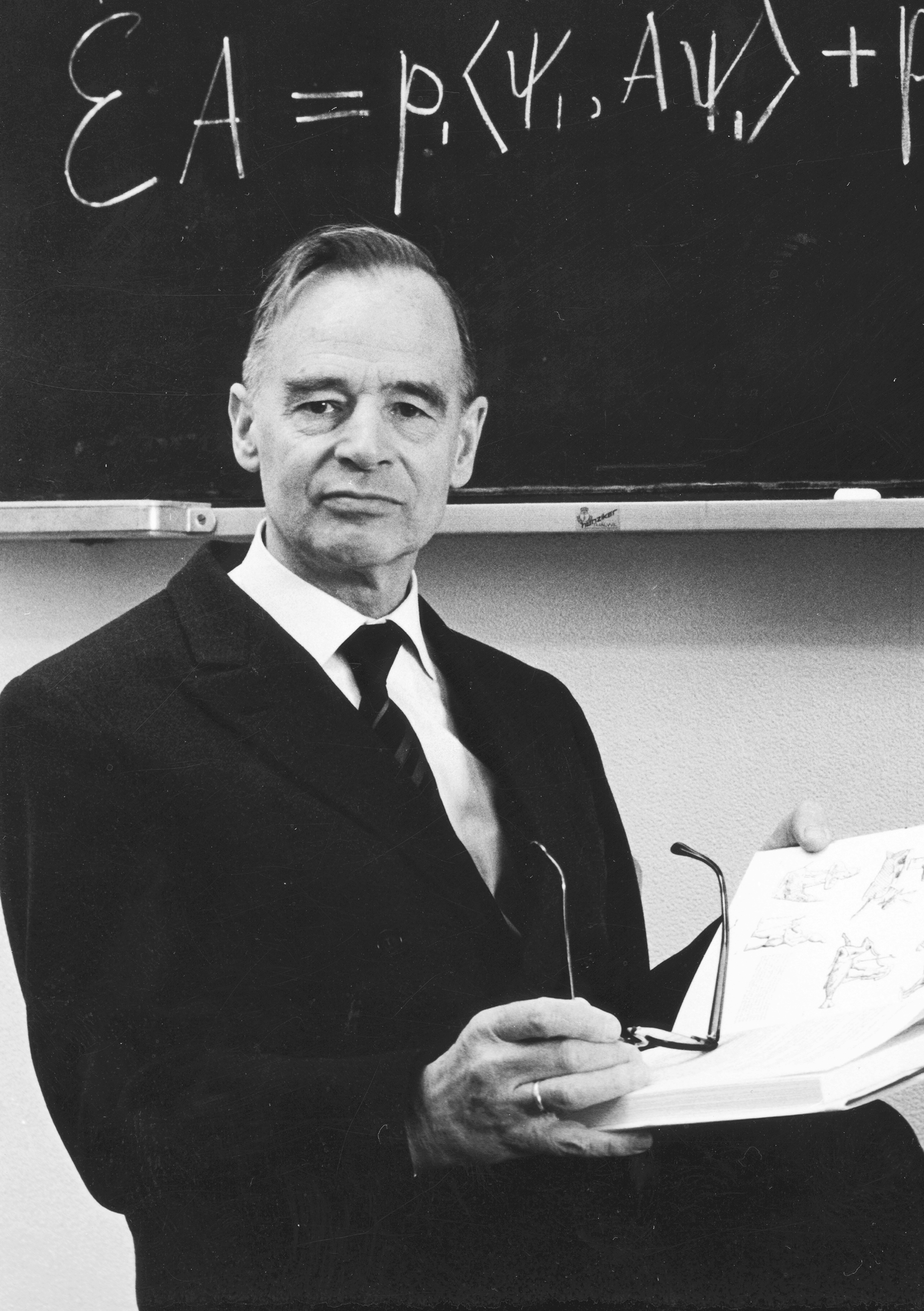
B. L. van der Waerden (pictured in 1980) was heavily influenced by Noether at Göttingen.

In 1924, the young Dutch mathematician Bartel Leendert van der Waerden arrived at the University of Göttingen. He immediately began working with Noether, who taught him methods of abstract conceptualization. Van der Waerden later said her originality was "absolute beyond comparison". After returning to Amsterdam, he wrote Moderne Algebra, a central two-volume text in the field; its second volume, published in 1931, borrowed heavily from Noether's work. Noether did not seek recognition, but he included as a note in the seventh edition "based in part on lectures by E. Artin and E. Noether". Beginning in 1927, Noether worked closely with Emil Artin, Richard Brauer, and Helmut Hasse on noncommutative algebras.

Van der Waerden's visit was part of a convergence of mathematicians from all over the world to Göttingen, which had become a major hub of mathematical and physical research. Russian mathematicians Pavel Alexandrov and Pavel Urysohn were the first of several in 1923. Between 1926 and 1930, Alexandrov regularly lectured at the university, and he and Noether became good friends. He dubbed her der Noether, using der as an epithet rather than a masculine German article. (Note: The nickname was not always used in a well-meaning manner. In Noether's obituary, Hermann stated that The power of your genius seemed to transcend the bounds of your sex, which is why we in Göttingen, in awed mockery, often spoke of you in the masculine form as "der Noether.") She tried to arrange a position for him as a regular professor at Göttingen, but could only help him secure a scholarship from the Rockefeller Foundation to Princeton University for the 1927–28 academic year.

==== Graduate students ====
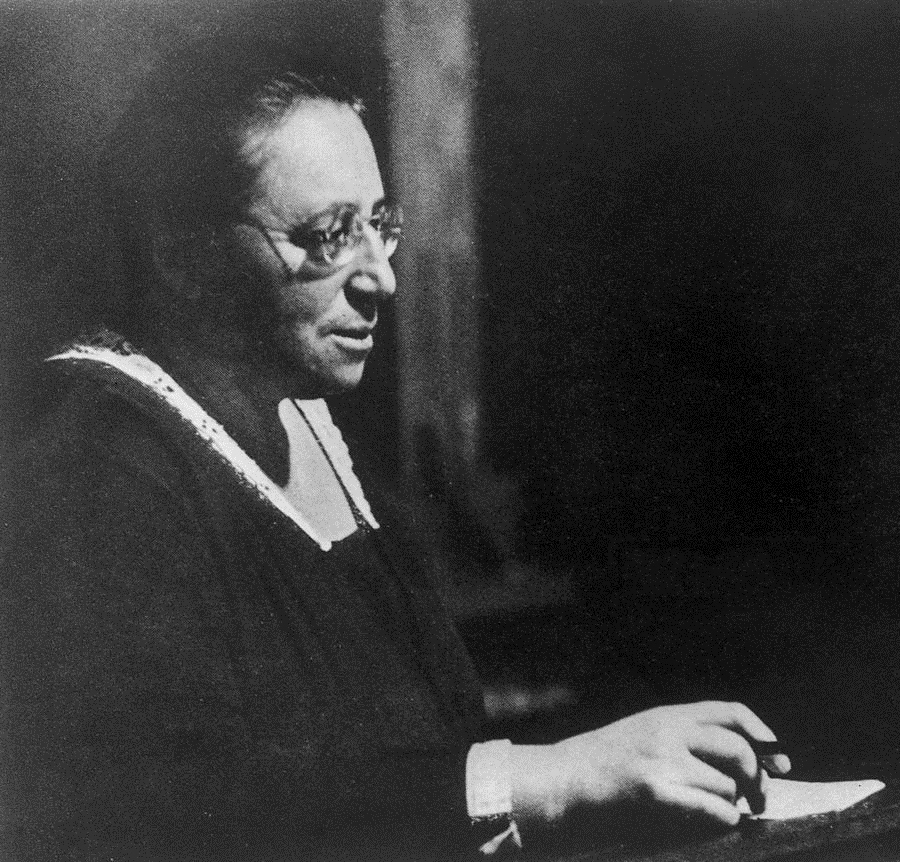
Noether c. 1930

In Göttingen, Noether supervised more than a dozen doctoral students; most were with Edmund Landau and others as she was not allowed to supervise dissertations on her own. Her first was Grete Hermann, who defended her dissertation in February 1925. She is best remembered for her work on the foundations of quantum mechanics, but her dissertation was considered an important contribution to ideal theory. Hermann later spoke reverently of her "dissertation-mother".

Around the same time, Heinrich Grell and Rudolf Hölzer wrote their dissertations under Noether. Hölzer died of tuberculosis shortly before his defense. Grell defended his thesis in 1926 and went on to work at the University of Jena and the University of Halle before losing his teaching license in 1935 due to accusations of homosexual acts. He was later reinstated and became a professor at Humboldt University in 1948.

Noether then supervised Werner Weber and Jakob Levitzki, who both defended their theses in 1929. Weber, who was considered only a modest mathematician, later took part in driving Jewish mathematicians out of Göttingen. Levitzki worked first at Yale University and then at the Hebrew University of Jerusalem in then British-ruled Mandatory Palestine, making significant contributions (in particular Levitzky's theorem and the Hopkins–Levitzki theorem) to ring theory.

Other "Noether Boys" included Max Deuring, Hans Fitting, Ernst Witt, Chiungtze C. Tsen, and Otto Schilling. Deuring, who had been considered the most promising of Noether's students, received his doctorate in 1930. He worked in Hamburg, Marden, and Göttingen (Note: When Noether was forced to leave Germany in 1933, she wished for the university to appoint Deuring as her successor, but he only started teaching there in 1950.) and is known for his contributions to arithmetic geometry. Fitting graduated in 1931 with a thesis on abelian groups and is remembered for his work in group theory, particularly Fitting's theorem and the Fitting lemma. He died at the age of 31 of a bone disease.

Witt was initially supervised by Noether, but her position was revoked in April 1933 and he was reassigned to Gustav Herglotz. He received his PhD in July 1933 with a thesis on the Riemann-Roch theorem and zeta-functions, and went on to make several contributions that bear his name. Tsen, best remembered for proving Tsen's theorem, received his doctorate that December. He returned to China in 1935 to teach at National Chekiang University, but died five years later. (Note: Accounts of Tsen's date of death vary: Kimberling (1981, p. 41) states that he died "some time in 1939 or 40" and Ding, Kang & Tan (1999) state that he died in November 1940, but a local newspaper recorded his date of death as 1 October 1940.) Schilling also began studying under Noether, but was forced to find a new advisor due to Noether's emigration. Under Helmut Hasse, he completed his PhD in 1934 at the University of Marburg. He later worked as a postdoc at Trinity College, Cambridge, before moving to the United States.

Noether's other students were Wilhelm Dörnte, who received his doctorate in 1927 with a thesis on groups; Werner Vorbeck, who did so in 1935 with a thesis on splitting fields; and Wolfgang Wichmann, who did so in 1936 with a thesis on p-adic theory. There is no information about the first two, but it is known that Wichmann supported a student initiative that unsuccessfully attempted to revoke Noether's dismissal and died as a soldier on the Eastern Front during World War II.

==== Noether school ====
Noether developed a close circle of mathematicians beyond just her doctoral students who shared her approach to abstract algebra and contributed to the field's development, a group often called the Noether school. An example is her close work with Wolfgang Krull, who greatly advanced commutative algebra with his Hauptidealsatz and his dimension theory for commutative rings. Another is Gottfried Köthe, who contributed to the development of the theory of hypercomplex quantities using Noether and Krull's methods.

In addition to her mathematical insight, Noether was respected for her consideration of others. She sometimes acted rudely toward those who disagreed with her, but gained a reputation for helpfulness and patient guidance of new students. Her loyalty to mathematical precision caused one colleague to call her "a severe critic", but she combined this demand for accuracy with a nurturing attitude. In Noether's obituary, Van der Waerden wrote:

Completely unegotistical and free of vanity, she never claimed anything for herself, but promoted the works of her students above all.

Noether showed a devotion to her subject and her students that extended beyond the academic day. Once, when the building was closed for a holiday, she gathered the class on the steps outside, led them through the woods, and lectured at a local coffee house. Later, after Nazi Germany dismissed her from teaching, she invited students into her home to discuss their plans for the future and mathematical concepts.

==== Influential lectures ====
Noether's frugal lifestyle was at first due to her being denied pay for her work. Even after the university began paying her a small salary in 1923, she continued to live a simple and modest life. She was paid more generously later in her life, but saved half of her salary to bequeath to her nephew, Gottfried E. Noether.

Biographers suggest that she was mostly unconcerned about appearance and manners, focusing on her studies. Olga Taussky-Todd, a distinguished algebraist taught by Noether, described a luncheon during which Noether, wholly engrossed in a discussion of mathematics, "gesticulated wildly" as she ate and "spilled her food constantly and wiped it off from her dress, completely unperturbed". Appearance-conscious students cringed as she retrieved the handkerchief from her blouse and ignored the increasing disarray of her hair during a lecture. Two female students once approached her during a break in a two-hour class to express their concern, but were unable to break through the energetic mathematical discussion she was having with other students.

Noether did not follow a lesson plan in her lectures. She spoke quickly, and many found her lectures difficult to follow, including Carl Ludwig Siegel and Paul Dubreil. Students who disliked her style often felt alienated. "Outsiders" who occasionally visited Noether's lectures usually spent only half an hour in the room before leaving in frustration or confusion. A regular student said of one such instance: "The enemy has been defeated".

Noether used her lectures as spontaneous discussion time with her students, to think through and clarify important problems. Some of her most important results were developed in these lectures, and her students' notes formed the basis for several important textbooks, such as van der Waerden's and Deuring's. Noether's most dedicated students inherited her enthusiasm for mathematics and relished their conversations with her.

Several of Noether's colleagues attended her lectures, and she sometimes allowed others (including her students) to receive credit for her ideas, so that much of her work appeared in papers not under her name. Noether was recorded as having given at least five semester-long courses at Göttingen:

- Winter 1924–25: Gruppentheorie und hyperkomplexe Zahlen [Group Theory and Hypercomplex Numbers]
- Winter 1927–28: Hyperkomplexe Grössen und Darstellungstheorie [Hypercomplex Quantities and Representation Theory]
- Summer 1928: Nichtkommutative Algebra [Noncommutative Algebra]
- Summer 1929: Nichtkommutative Arithmetik [Noncommutative Arithmetic]
- Winter 1929–30: Algebra der hyperkomplexen Grössen [Algebra of Hypercomplex Quantities]

=== Moscow State University ===
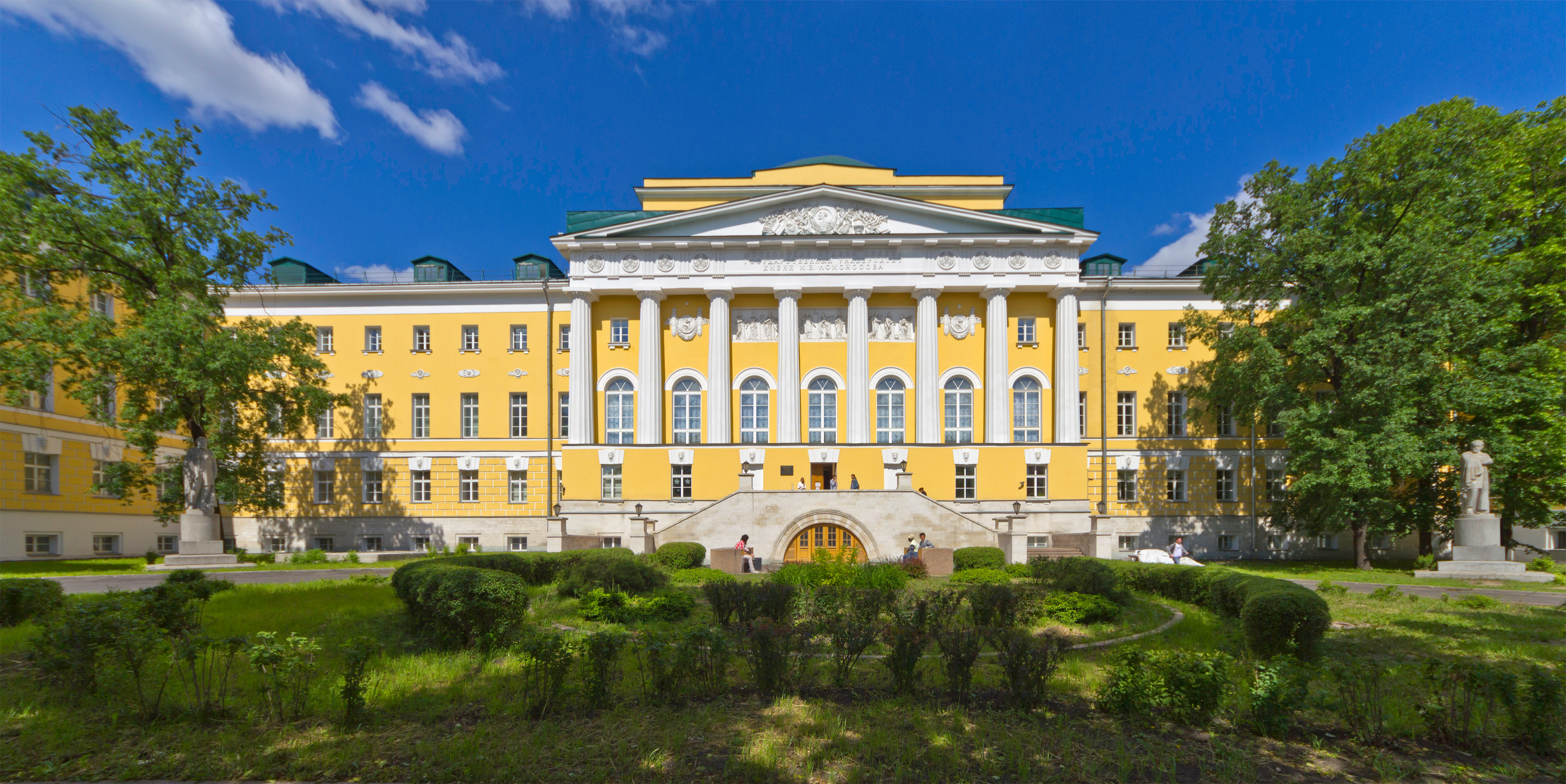
Noether taught at Moscow State University in 1928–1929.

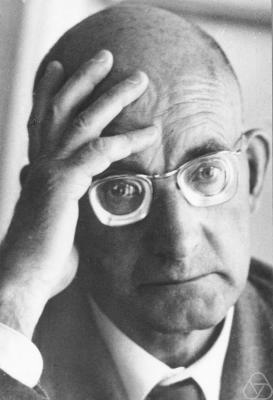
Pavel Alexandrov

In 1928–1929, Noether accepted an invitation to Moscow State University, where she continued working with P. S. Alexandrov. In addition to carrying on with her research, she taught classes in abstract algebra and algebraic geometry. She worked with the topologists Lev Pontryagin and Nikolai Chebotaryov, who later praised her contributions to the development of Galois theory.

Politics was not central to her life, but Noether took a keen interest in political matters and, according to Alexandrov, showed considerable support for the Russian Revolution. She was especially happy to see Soviet advances in the fields of science and mathematics, which she considered indicative of new opportunities made possible by the Bolshevik project. This attitude caused her problems in Germany, culminating in her eviction from a pension lodging building, after student leaders complained of living with "a Marxist-leaning Jewess". Hermann Weyl recalled that "During the wild times after the Revolution of 1918," Noether "sided more or less with the Social Democrats". She was a member of the Independent Social Democrats from 1919 to 1922, a short-lived splinter party. In the words of logician and historian Colin McLarty, "she was not a Bolshevist, but was not afraid to be called one."

Noether planned to return to Moscow, an effort for which she received support from Alexandrov. After she left Germany in 1933, he tried to help her gain a chair at Moscow State University through the Soviet Education Ministry. This proved unsuccessful, but they corresponded frequently during the 1930s, and in 1935 she made plans for a return to the Soviet Union.

=== Recognition ===
In 1932, Emmy Noether and Emil Artin received the Ackermann–Teubner Memorial Award for their contributions to mathematics. The prize included a monetary reward of 500 ℛ︁ℳ︁ and was seen as a long-overdue official recognition of her considerable work in the field. Nevertheless, her colleagues expressed frustration at the fact that she was not elected to the Göttingen Gesellschaft der Wissenschaften (academy of sciences) and was never promoted to the position of Ordentlicher Professor (full professor).

Noether's colleagues celebrated her fiftieth birthday, in 1932, in typical mathematicians' style. Helmut Hasse dedicated an article to her in the Mathematische Annalen, wherein he confirmed her suspicion that some aspects of noncommutative algebra are simpler than those of commutative algebra, by proving a noncommutative reciprocity law. This pleased her immensely. He also sent her a mathematical riddle, which he called the "m_{μν}-riddle of syllables". She solved it immediately, but the riddle has been lost.

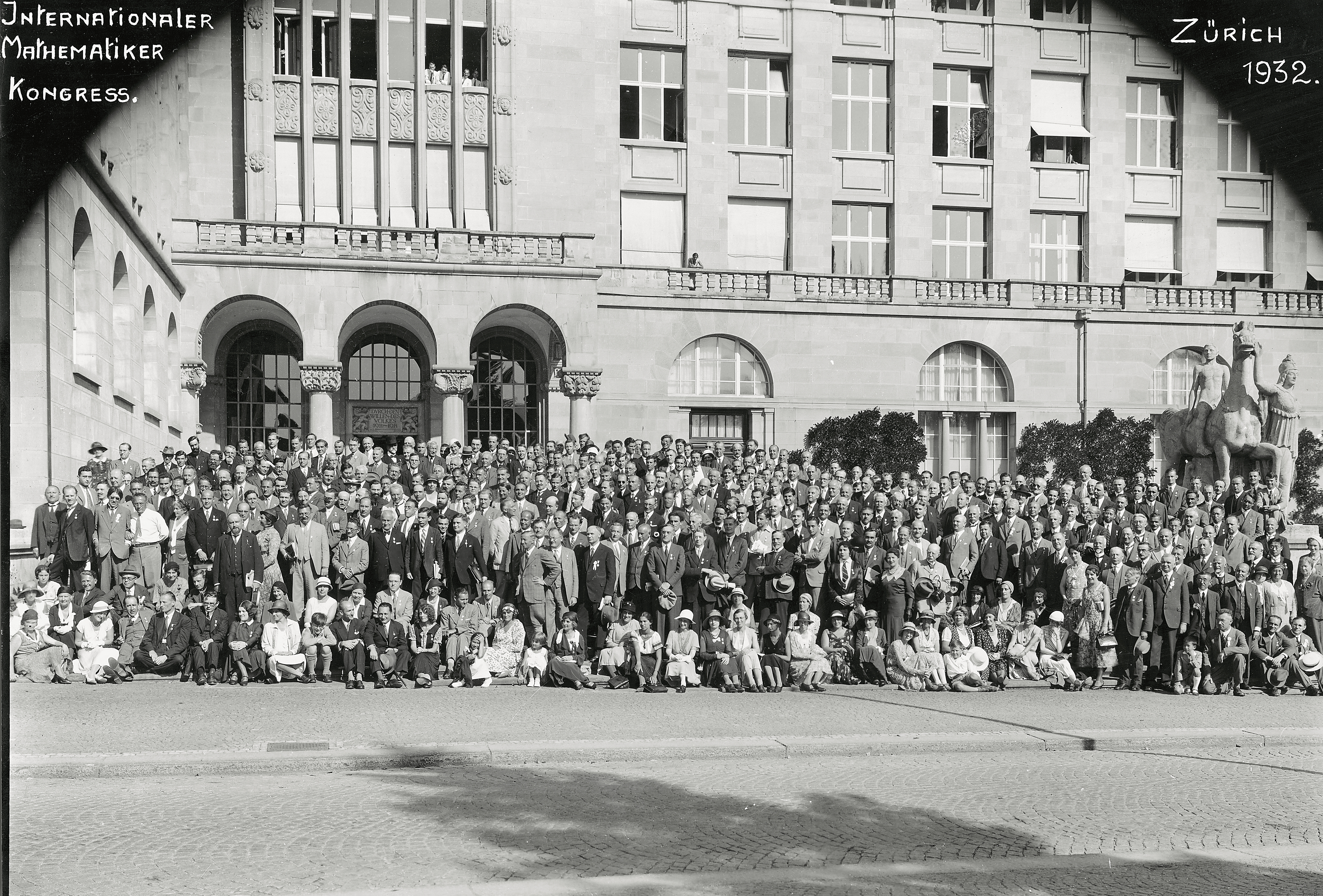
Noether visited Zürich in 1932 to deliver a plenary address at the International Congress of Mathematicians.

In September of the same year, Noether delivered a plenary address (großer Vortrag) on "Hyper-complex systems in their relations to commutative algebra and to number theory" at the International Congress of Mathematicians in Zürich. The congress was attended by 800 people, including Noether's colleagues Hermann Weyl, Edmund Landau, and Wolfgang Krull. There were 420 official participants and twenty-one plenary addresses presented. Apparently, Noether's prominent speaking position was a recognition of the importance of her contributions to mathematics. The 1932 congress is sometimes described as the high point of her career.

=== Expulsion from Göttingen by Nazi Germany ===
When Adolf Hitler became the German Reichskanzler in January 1933, Nazi activity around the country increased dramatically. At the University of Göttingen, the German Student Association led the attack on the "un-German spirit" attributed to Jews and was aided by privatdozent and Noether's former student Werner Weber. Antisemitic attitudes created a climate hostile to Jewish professors. One young protester reportedly demanded: "Aryan students want Aryan mathematics and not Jewish mathematics."

One of the first actions of Hitler's administration was the Law for the Restoration of the Professional Civil Service which removed Jews and politically suspect government employees (including university professors) from their jobs unless they had "demonstrated their loyalty to Germany" by serving in World War I. In April 1933, Noether received a notice from the Prussian Ministry for Sciences, Art, and Public Education which read: "On the basis of paragraph 3 of the Civil Service Code of 7 April 1933, I hereby withdraw from you the right to teach at the University of Göttingen." Several of Noether's colleagues, including Max Born and Richard Courant, also had their positions revoked.

Noether accepted the decision calmly, providing support for others during this difficult time. Hermann Weyl later wrote that "Emmy Noether – her courage, her frankness, her unconcern about her own fate, her conciliatory spirit – was in the midst of all the hatred and meanness, despair and sorrow surrounding us, a moral solace." Typically, Noether remained focused on mathematics, gathering students in her apartment to discuss class field theory. When one of her students appeared in the uniform of the Nazi paramilitary organization Sturmabteilung (SA), she showed no sign of agitation and, reportedly, even laughed about it later.

=== Refuge at Bryn Mawr and Princeton ===
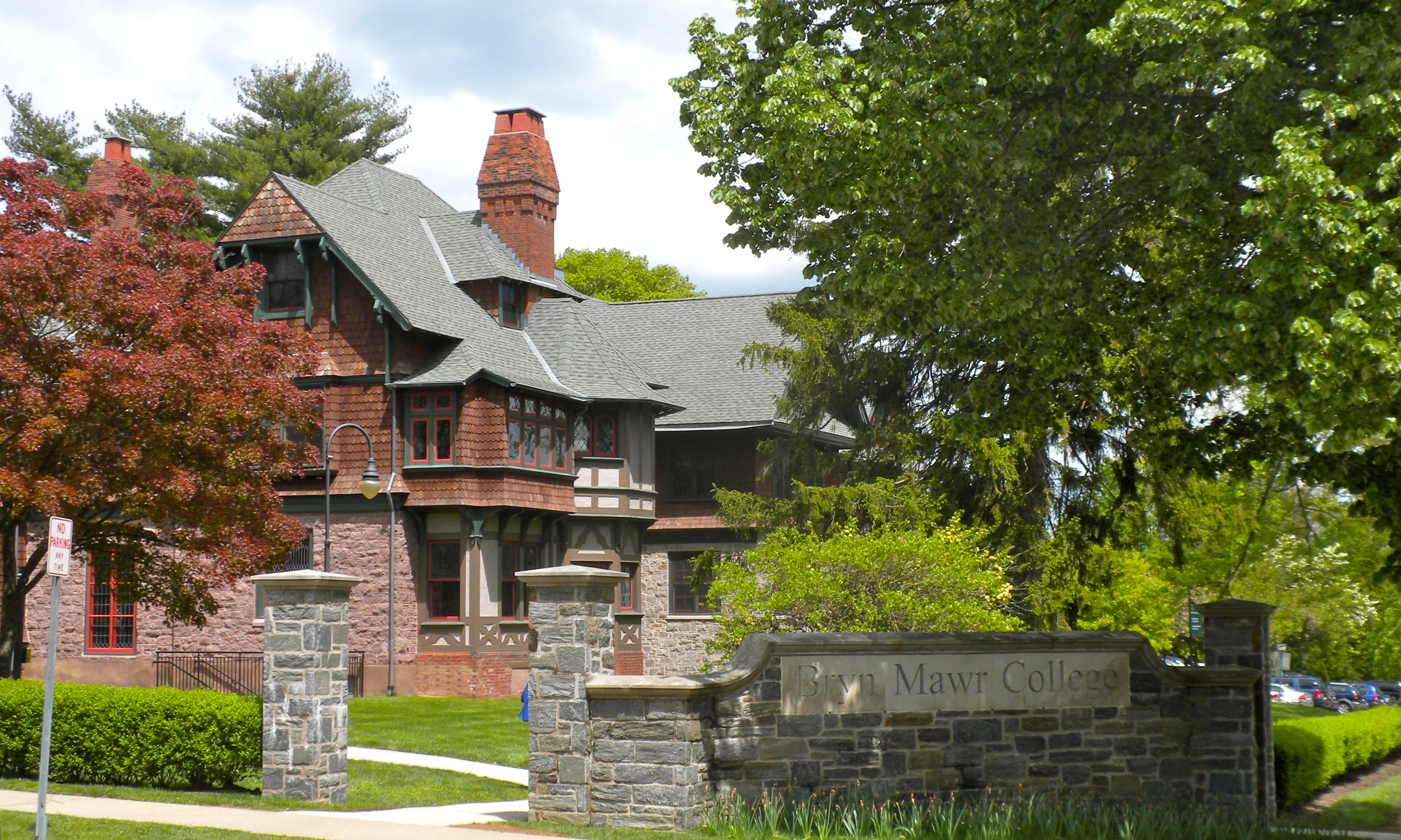
Bryn Mawr College provided a welcoming home for Noether during the last two years of her life.

As dozens of newly unemployed professors began searching for positions outside Germany, their colleagues in the United States provided assistance and job opportunities for them. Albert Einstein and Hermann Weyl were appointed by the Institute for Advanced Study in Princeton, while others worked to find a sponsor required for legal immigration. Noether was contacted by representatives of two educational institutions: Bryn Mawr College, in the U.S., and Somerville College at the University of Oxford, in England. After a series of negotiations with the Rockefeller Foundation, a grant to Bryn Mawr was approved for Noether and she took a position there in late 1933.

At Bryn Mawr, Noether met and befriended Anna Wheeler, who had studied at Göttingen just before Noether arrived there. Another source of support at the college was Bryn Mawr's president, Marion Edwards Park, who enthusiastically invited mathematicians in the area to "see Dr. Noether in action!"

At Bryn Mawr, Noether formed a group, sometimes called the Noether girls, of four post-doctoral (Grace Shover Quinn, Marie Johanna Weiss, Olga Taussky-Todd) and doctoral (Ruth Stauffer) students. They enthusiastically worked through van der Waerden's Moderne Algebra I and parts of Erich Hecke's Theorie der algebraischen Zahlen (Theory of algebraic numbers). Stauffer was Noether's only doctoral student in the U.S.; Noether died shortly before she graduated. She took her examination with Richard Brauer and received her degree in June 1935, with a thesis on separable normal extensions. After her doctorate, Stauffer worked as a teacher for a short period and as a statistician for over 30 years.

In 1934, Noether began lecturing at the Institute for Advanced Study in Princeton upon the invitation of Abraham Flexner and Oswald Veblen. She also worked with Abraham Albert and Harry Vandiver. She said of Princeton University that she was not welcome at "the men's university, where nothing female is admitted".

Her time in the U.S. was pleasant; she was surrounded by supportive colleagues and absorbed in her favorite subjects. In mid-1934, she briefly returned to Germany to see Emil Artin and her brother Fritz. The latter, after having been forced out of his job at the Technische Hochschule Breslau, had accepted a position at the Research Institute for Mathematics and Mechanics in Tomsk, in the Siberian Federal District of Russia.

Many of her former colleagues had been forced out of the universities, but she was able to use the library in Göttingen as a "foreign scholar". Without incident, Noether returned to the U.S. and her studies at Bryn Mawr.

=== Death ===
In April 1935, doctors discovered a tumor in Noether's pelvis. Worried about complications from surgery, they ordered two days of bed rest first. During the operation they discovered an ovarian cyst "the size of a large cantaloupe". Two smaller tumors in her uterus appeared to be benign and were not removed to avoid prolonging surgery. For three days she appeared to convalesce normally, and she recovered quickly from a circulatory collapse on the fourth. On 14 April, Noether fell unconscious, her temperature soared to 109 °F (42.8 °C), and she died. "[I]t is not easy to say what had occurred in Dr. Noether", one of the physicians wrote. "It is possible that there was some form of unusual and virulent infection, which struck the base of the brain where the heat centers are supposed to be located." She was 53.

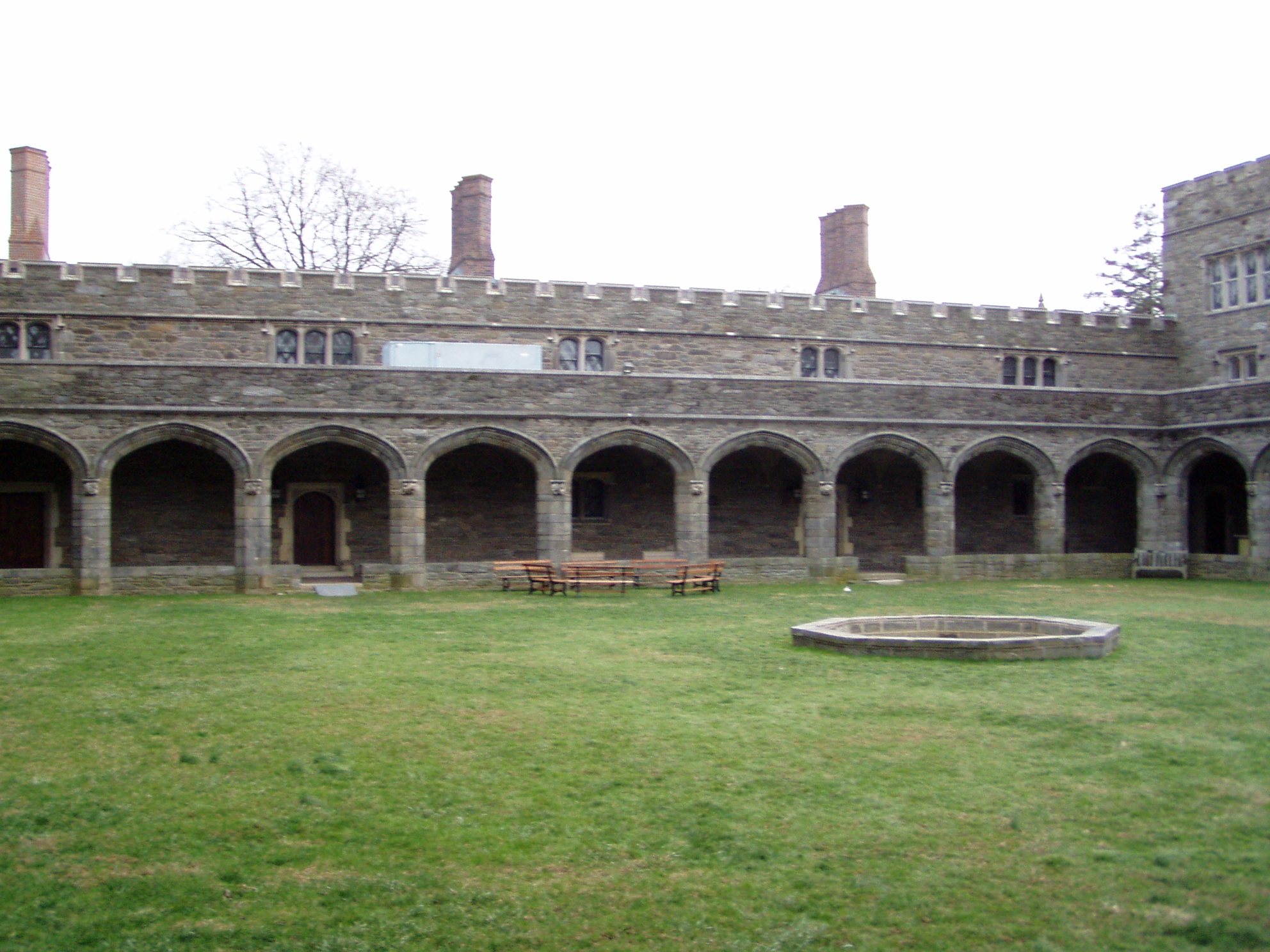
Noether's ashes were placed under the cloistered walkway of Bryn Mawr's Old Library.

A few days after Noether's death, her friends and associates at Bryn Mawr held a small memorial service at College President Park's house. Hermann Weyl and Richard Brauer both traveled from Princeton and delivered eulogies. In the months that followed, written tributes began to appear: Albert Einstein joined van der Waerden, Weyl, and Pavel Alexandrov in paying their respects. Her body was cremated and the ashes interred under the walkway around the cloisters of the Old Library at Bryn Mawr.

== Contributions to mathematics and physics ==
Noether's work in abstract algebra and topology was influential in mathematics, while Noether's theorem has widespread consequences for theoretical physics and dynamical systems. Noether showed an acute propensity for abstract thought, which allowed her to approach problems of mathematics in fresh and original ways. Her friend and colleague Hermann Weyl described her scholarly output in three epochs:

(1) the period of relative dependence, 1907–1919

(2) the investigations grouped around the general theory of ideals 1920–1926

(3) the study of the non-commutative algebras, their representations by linear transformations, and their application to the study of commutative number fields and their arithmetics

— Weyl 1935

Noether's theorem has been called "one of the most important mathematical theorems ever proved in guiding the development of modern physics".

She crafted new systems of mathematical definitions that would be used by future mathematicians. In particular, she developed a completely new theory of ideals in rings, generalizing the earlier work of Richard Dedekind. She is also renowned for developing ascending chain conditions – a simple finiteness condition that yielded powerful results in her hands. Such conditions and the theory of ideals enabled Noether to generalize many older results and to treat old problems from a new perspective, such as the topics of algebraic invariants that had been studied by her father and elimination theory, discussed below.

Noether's most important contributions to mathematics were to the development of an emerging new field, abstract algebra.

Unlike most mathematicians, she did not make abstractions by generalizing from known examples; rather, she worked directly with the abstractions. In his obituary of Noether, van der Waerden recalled that

The maxim by which Emmy Noether was guided throughout her work might be formulated as follows: "Any relationships between numbers, functions, and operations become transparent, generally applicable, and fully productive only after they have been isolated from their particular objects and been formulated as universally valid concepts."

This is the begriffliche Mathematik (purely conceptual mathematics) that was characteristic of Noether. This style of mathematics was consequently adopted by other mathematicians, especially in the (then new) field of abstract algebra.

=== First epoch (1908–1919) ===
==== Algebraic invariant theory ====
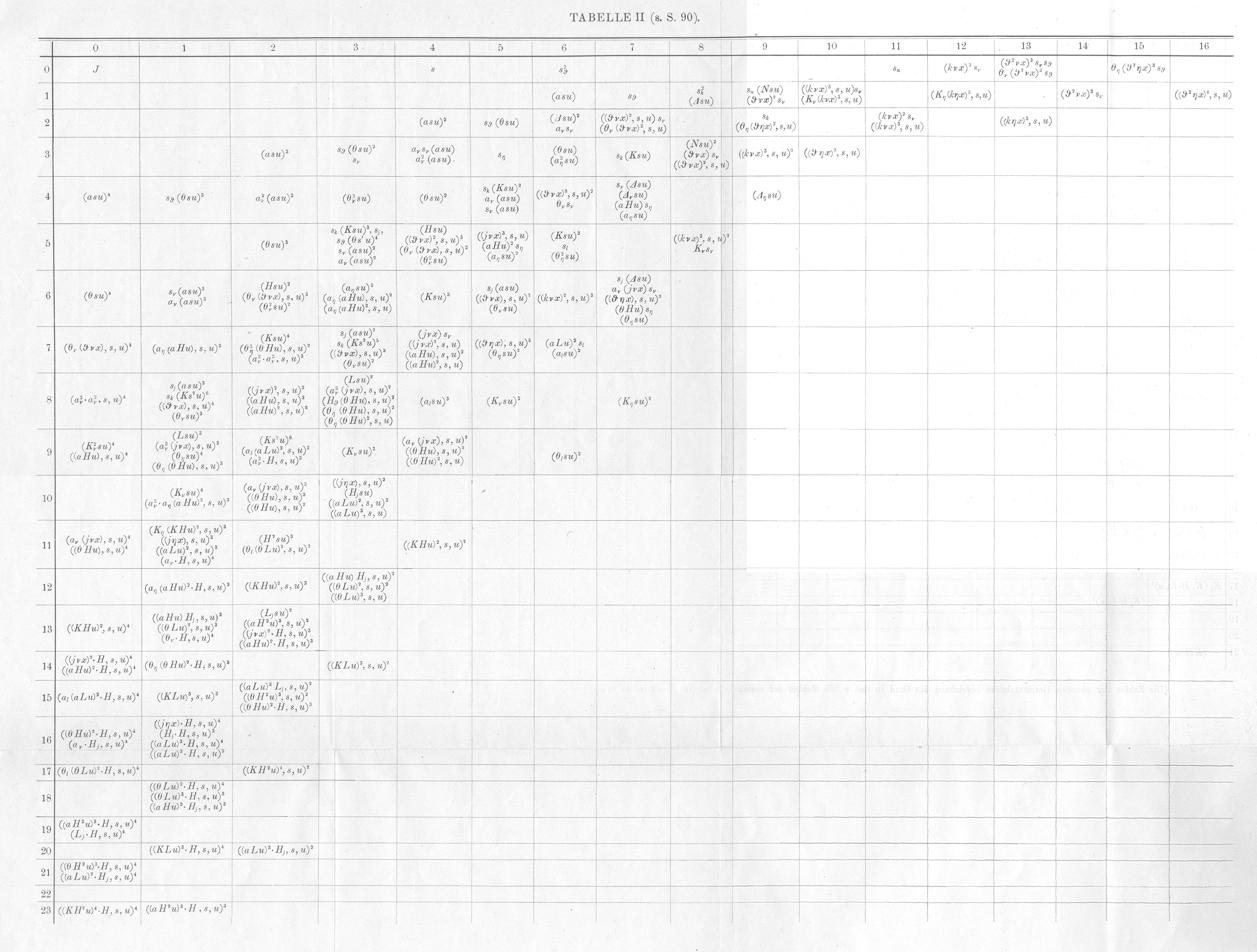
Table 2 from Noether's dissertation on invariant theory. This table collects 202 of the 331 invariants of ternary biquadratic forms. These forms are graded in two variables x and u. The horizontal direction of the table lists the invariants with increasing grades in x, while the vertical direction lists them with increasing grades in u.

Much of Noether's work in the first epoch of her career was associated with invariant theory, principally algebraic invariant theory. Invariant theory is concerned with expressions that remain constant (invariant) under a group of transformations. As an everyday example, if a rigid metre-stick is rotated, the coordinates of its endpoints change, but its length remains the same. A more sophisticated example of an invariant is the discriminant B^{2} − 4AC of a homogeneous quadratic polynomial Ax^{2} + Bxy + Cy^{2}, where x and y are indeterminates. The discriminant is called "invariant" because it is not changed by linear substitutions x → ax + by and y → cx + dy with determinant ad − bc = 1. These substitutions form the special linear group SL_{2}.

One can ask for all polynomials in A, B, and C that are unchanged by the action of SL_{2}; these turn out to be the polynomials in the discriminant. More generally, one can ask for the invariants of homogeneous polynomials A_{0}x^{r}y^{0} + ... + A_{r}x^{0}y^{r} of higher degree, which will be certain polynomials in the coefficients A_{0}, ..., A_{r}, and more generally still, one can ask the similar question for homogeneous polynomials in more than two variables.

One of the main goals of invariant theory was to solve the "finite basis problem". The sum or product of any two invariants is invariant, and the finite basis problem asked whether it was possible to get all the invariants by starting with a finite list of invariants, called generators, and then, adding or multiplying the generators together. For example, the discriminant gives a finite basis (with one element) for the invariants of a quadratic polynomial.

Noether's advisor, Paul Gordan, was known as the "king of invariant theory", and his chief contribution to mathematics was his 1870 solution of the finite basis problem for invariants of homogeneous polynomials in two variables. He proved this by giving a constructive method for finding all of the invariants and their generators, but was not able to carry out this constructive approach for invariants in three or more variables. In 1890, David Hilbert proved a similar statement for the invariants of homogeneous polynomials in any number of variables. Furthermore, his method worked, not only for the special linear group, but also for some of its subgroups such as the special orthogonal group.

Noether followed Gordan's lead, writing her doctoral dissertation and several other publications on invariant theory. She extended Gordan's results and also built upon Hilbert's research. Later, she would disparage this work, finding it of little interest and admitting to forgetting the details of it. Hermann Weyl wrote,

[A] greater contrast is hardly imaginable than between her first paper, the dissertation, and her works of maturity; for the former is an extreme example of formal computations and the latter constitute an extreme and grandiose example of conceptual axiomatic thinking in mathematics.

==== Galois theory ====
Galois theory concerns transformations of number fields that permute the roots of an equation. Consider a polynomial equation of a variable x of degree n, in which the coefficients are drawn from some ground field, which might be, for example, the field of real numbers, rational numbers, or the integers modulo 7. There may or may not be choices of x, which make this polynomial evaluate to zero. Such choices, if they exist, are called roots. For example, if the polynomial is x^{2} + 1 and the field is the real numbers, then the polynomial has no roots, because any choice of x makes the polynomial greater than or equal to one. If the field is extended then the polynomial may gain roots, and if it is extended enough, then it always has a number of roots equal to its degree.

Continuing the previous example, if the field is enlarged to the complex numbers, then the polynomial gains two roots, +i and −i, where i is the imaginary unit, that is, i^{2} = −1. More generally, the extension field in which a polynomial can be factored into its roots is known as the splitting field of the polynomial.

The Galois group of a polynomial is the set of all transformations of the splitting field which preserve the ground field and the roots of the polynomial. (These transformations are called automorphisms.) The Galois group of x^{2} + 1 consists of two elements: The identity transformation, which sends every complex number to itself, and complex conjugation, which sends +i to −i. Since the Galois group does not change the ground field, it leaves the coefficients of the polynomial unchanged, so it must leave the set of all roots unchanged. Each root can move to another root, so transformation determines a permutation of the n roots among themselves. The significance of the Galois group derives from the fundamental theorem of Galois theory, which proves that the fields lying between the ground field and the splitting field are in one-to-one correspondence with the subgroups of the Galois group.

In 1918, Noether published a paper on the inverse Galois problem. Instead of determining the Galois group of transformations of a given field and its extension, Noether asked whether, given a field and a group, it always is possible to find an extension of the field that has the given group as its Galois group. She reduced this to "Noether's problem", which asks whether the fixed field of a subgroup G of the permutation group S_{n} acting on the field k(x_{1}, ..., x_{n}) always is a pure transcendental extension of the field k. (She first mentioned this problem in a 1913 paper, where she attributed the problem to her colleague Fischer.) She showed this was true for n = 2, 3, or 4. In 1969, Richard Swan found a counterexample to Noether's problem, with n = 47 and G a cyclic group of order 47 (although this group can be realized as a Galois group over the rationals in other ways). The inverse Galois problem remains unsolved.

==== Physics ====
Noether was brought to Göttingen in 1915 by Hilbert and Klein, who wanted her expertise in invariant theory to help them understand general relativity, a geometrical theory of gravitation developed mainly by Einstein. Hilbert had observed that the conservation of energy seemed to be violated in general relativity, because gravitational energy could itself gravitate. Noether provided the resolution of this paradox, and a fundamental tool of modern theoretical physics, in a 1918 paper. This paper presented two theorems, of which the first is known as Noether's theorem. Together, these theorems not only solve the problem for general relativity, but also determine the conserved quantities for every system of physical laws that possesses some continuous symmetry. Upon receiving her work, Einstein wrote to Hilbert:

Yesterday I received from Miss Noether a very interesting paper on invariants. I'm impressed that such things can be understood in such a general way. The old guard at Göttingen should take some lessons from Miss Noether! She seems to know her stuff.

For illustration, if a physical system behaves the same, regardless of how it is oriented in space, the physical laws that govern it are rotationally symmetric; from this symmetry, Noether's theorem shows the angular momentum of the system must be conserved. The physical system itself need not be symmetric; a jagged asteroid tumbling in space conserves angular momentum despite its asymmetry. Rather, the symmetry of the physical laws governing the system is responsible for the conservation law. As another example, if a physical experiment works the same way at any place and at any time, then its laws are symmetric under continuous translations in space and time; by Noether's theorem, these symmetries account for the conservation laws of linear momentum and energy within this system, respectively.

At the time, physicists were not familiar with Sophus Lie's theory of continuous groups, on which Noether had built. Many physicists first learned of Noether's theorem from an article by Edward Lee Hill that presented only a special case of it. Consequently, the full scope of her result was not immediately appreciated. During the latter half of the 20th century, Noether's theorem became a fundamental tool of modern theoretical physics, because of the insight it gives into conservation laws, and also as a practical calculation tool. Her theorem allows researchers to determine the conserved quantities from the observed symmetries of a physical system. Conversely, it facilitates the description of a physical system based on classes of hypothetical physical laws. For illustration, suppose that a new physical phenomenon is discovered. Noether's theorem provides a test for theoretical models of the phenomenon: If the theory has a continuous symmetry, then Noether's theorem guarantees that the theory has a conserved quantity, and for the theory to be correct, this conservation must be observable in experiments.

=== Second epoch (1920–1926) ===
==== Ascending and descending chain conditions ====
In this epoch, Noether became famous for her deft use of ascending (Teilerkettensatz) or descending (Vielfachenkettensatz) chain conditions. A sequence of non-empty subsets A_{1}, A_{2}, A_{3}, ... of a set S is usually said to be ascending if each is a subset of the next:

$$A_{1} \subseteq A_{2} \subseteq A_{3} \subseteq \cdots.$$

Conversely, a sequence of subsets of S is called descending if each contains the next subset:

$$A_{1} \supseteq A_{2} \supseteq A_{3} \supseteq \cdots.$$

A chain becomes constant after a finite number of steps if there is an n such that $A_n = A_m$ for all m ≥ n. A collection of subsets of a given set satisfies the ascending chain condition if every ascending sequence becomes constant after a finite number of steps. It satisfies the descending chain condition if any descending sequence becomes constant after a finite number of steps. Chain conditions can be used to show that every set of sub-objects has a maximal/minimal element, or that a complex object can be generated by a smaller number of elements.

Many types of objects in abstract algebra can satisfy chain conditions, and usually if they satisfy an ascending chain condition, they are called Noetherian in her honor. By definition, a Noetherian ring satisfies an ascending chain condition on its left and right ideals, whereas a Noetherian group is defined as a group in which every strictly ascending chain of subgroups is finite. A Noetherian module is a module in which every strictly ascending chain of submodules becomes constant after a finite number of steps. A Noetherian space is a topological space whose open subsets satisfy the ascending chain condition; (Note: Or whose closed subsets satisfy the descending chain condition.) this definition makes the spectrum of a Noetherian ring a Noetherian topological space.

The chain condition often is "inherited" by sub-objects. For example, all subspaces of a Noetherian space are Noetherian themselves; all subgroups and quotient groups of a Noetherian group are Noetherian; and, mutatis mutandis, the same holds for submodules and quotient modules of a Noetherian module. The chain condition also may be inherited by combinations or extensions of a Noetherian object. For example, finite direct sums of Noetherian rings are Noetherian, as is the ring of formal power series over a Noetherian ring.

Another application of such chain conditions is in Noetherian induction—also known as well-founded induction—which is a generalization of mathematical induction. It is frequently used to reduce general statements about collections of objects to statements about specific objects in that collection. Suppose that S is a partially ordered set. One way of proving a statement about the objects of S is to assume the existence of a counterexample and deduce a contradiction, thereby proving the contrapositive of the original statement. The basic premise of Noetherian induction is that every non-empty subset of S contains a minimal element. In particular, the set of all counterexamples contains a minimal element, the minimal counterexample. In order to prove the original statement, therefore, it suffices to prove something seemingly much weaker: For any counterexample, there is a smaller counterexample.

==== Commutative rings, ideals, and modules ====
Noether's paper Idealtheorie in Ringbereichen (Theory of Ideals in Ring Domains, 1921) is the foundation of general commutative ring theory, and gives one of the first general definitions of a commutative ring. (Note: The first definition of an abstract ring was given by Abraham Fraenkel in 1914, but the definition in current use was initially formulated by Masazo Sono in a 1917 paper.) Before her paper, most results in commutative algebra were restricted to special examples of commutative rings, such as polynomial rings over fields or rings of algebraic integers. Noether proved that in a ring that satisfies the ascending chain condition on ideals, every ideal is finitely generated. In 1943, French mathematician Claude Chevalley coined the term Noetherian ring to describe this property. A major result in Noether's 1921 paper is the Lasker–Noether theorem, which extends Lasker's theorem on the primary decomposition of ideals of polynomial rings to all Noetherian rings. The Lasker–Noether theorem can be viewed as a generalization of the fundamental theorem of arithmetic which states that any positive integer can be expressed as a product of prime numbers, and that this decomposition is unique.

Noether's work Abstrakter Aufbau der Idealtheorie in algebraischen Zahl- und Funktionenkörpern (Abstract Structure of the Theory of Ideals in Algebraic Number and Function Fields, 1927) characterized the rings in which the ideals have unique factorization into prime ideals (now called Dedekind domains). Noether showed that these rings were characterized by five conditions: they must satisfy the ascending and descending chain conditions, they must possess a unit element, but no zero divisors, and they must be integrally closed in their associated field of fractions. This paper also contains what now are called the isomorphism theorems, which describe some fundamental natural isomorphisms, and some other basic results on Noetherian and Artinian modules.

==== Elimination theory ====
In 1923–1924, Noether applied her ideal theory to elimination theory in a formulation that she attributed to her student, Kurt Hentzelt. She showed that fundamental theorems about the factorization of polynomials could be carried over directly.

Traditionally, elimination theory is concerned with eliminating one or more variables from a system of polynomial equations, often by the method of resultants. For illustration, a system of equations often can be written in the form

Mv = 0

where a matrix (or linear transform) M (without the variable x) times a vector v (that only has non-zero powers of x) is equal to the zero vector, 0. Hence, the determinant of the matrix M must be zero, providing a new equation in which the variable x has been eliminated.

==== Invariant theory of finite groups ====
Techniques such as Hilbert's original non-constructive solution to the finite basis problem could not be used to get quantitative information about the invariants of a group action, and furthermore, they did not apply to all group actions. In her 1915 paper, Noether found a solution to the finite basis problem for a finite group of transformations G acting on a finite-dimensional vector space over a field of characteristic zero. Her solution shows that the ring of invariants is generated by homogeneous invariants whose degree is less than, or equal to, the order of the finite group; this is called Noether's bound. Her paper gave two proofs of Noether's bound, both of which also work when the characteristic of the field is coprime to $\left|G\right|!$ (the factorial of the order $\left|G\right|$ of the group G). The degrees of generators need not satisfy Noether's bound when the characteristic of the field divides the number $\left|G\right|$, but Noether was not able to determine whether this bound was correct when the characteristic of the field divides $\left|G\right|!$ but not $\left|G\right|$. For many years, determining the truth or falsehood of this bound for this particular case was an open problem, called "Noether's gap". It was finally solved independently by Fleischmann in 2000 and Fogarty in 2001, who both showed that the bound remains true.

In her 1926 paper, Noether extended Hilbert's theorem to representations of a finite group over any field; the new case that did not follow from Hilbert's work is when the characteristic of the field divides the order of the group. Noether's result was later extended by William Haboush to all reductive groups by his proof of the Mumford conjecture. In this paper Noether also introduced the Noether normalization lemma, showing that a finitely generated domain A over a field k has a set {x_{1}, ..., x_{n}} of algebraically independent elements such that A is integral over k[x_{1}, ..., x_{n}].

==== Topology ====
A continuous deformation (homotopy) of a coffee cup into a doughnut (torus) and back

As noted by Hermann Weyl in his obituary, Noether's contributions to topology illustrate her generosity with ideas and how her insights could transform entire fields of mathematics. In topology, mathematicians study the properties of objects that remain invariant even under deformation, properties such as their connectedness. An old joke is that "a topologist cannot distinguish a donut from a coffee mug", since they can be continuously deformed into one another.

Noether is credited with fundamental ideas that led to the development of algebraic topology from the earlier combinatorial topology, specifically, the idea of homology groups. According to Alexandrov, Noether attended lectures given by him and Heinz Hopf in 1926 and 1927, where "she continually made observations which were often deep and subtle" and:

When ... she first became acquainted with a systematic construction of combinatorial topology, she immediately observed that it would be worthwhile to study directly the groups of algebraic complexes and cycles of a given polyhedron and the subgroup of the cycle group consisting of cycles homologous to zero; instead of the usual definition of Betti numbers, she suggested immediately defining the Betti group as the complementary (quotient) group of the group of all cycles by the subgroup of cycles homologous to zero. This observation now seems self-evident, but in those years (1925–1928) this was a completely new point of view.

Noether's suggestion that topology be studied algebraically was adopted immediately by Hopf, Alexandrov, and others, and it became a frequent topic of discussion among the mathematicians of Göttingen. Noether observed that her idea of a Betti group makes the Euler–Poincaré formula simpler to understand, and Hopf's own work on this subject "bears the imprint of these remarks of Emmy Noether". Noether mentions her own topology ideas only as an aside in a 1926 publication, where she cites it as an application of group theory.

This algebraic approach to topology was also developed independently in Austria. In a 1926–1927 course given in Vienna, Leopold Vietoris defined a homology group, which was developed by Walther Mayer into an axiomatic definition in 1928.

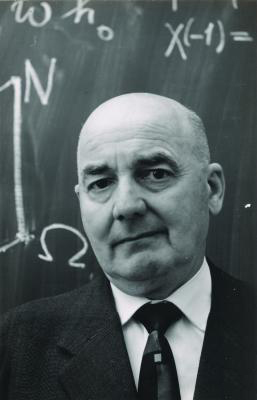
Helmut Hasse worked with Noether and others to found the theory of central simple algebras.

=== Third epoch (1927–1935) ===
==== Hypercomplex numbers and representation theory ====
Much work on hypercomplex numbers and group representations was carried out in the nineteenth and early twentieth centuries, but remained disparate. Noether united these earlier results and gave the first general representation theory of groups and algebras. This single work by Noether was said to have ushered in a new period in modern algebra and to have been of fundamental importance for its development.

Briefly, Noether subsumed the structure theory of associative algebras and the representation theory of groups into a single arithmetic theory of modules and ideals in rings satisfying ascending chain conditions.

==== Noncommutative algebra ====
Noether also was responsible for a number of other advances in the field of algebra. With Emil Artin, Richard Brauer, and Helmut Hasse, she founded the theory of central simple algebras.

A paper by Noether, Hasse, and Brauer pertains to division algebras, which are algebraic systems in which division is possible. They proved two important theorems: a local-global theorem stating that if a finite-dimensional central division algebra over a number field splits locally everywhere then it splits globally (so is trivial), and from this, deduced their Hauptsatz ("main theorem"):

Every finite-dimensional central division algebra over an algebraic number field F splits over a cyclic cyclotomic extension.

These theorems allow one to classify all finite-dimensional central division algebras over a given number field. A subsequent paper by Noether showed, as a special case of a more general theorem, that all maximal subfields of a division algebra D are splitting fields. This paper also contains the Skolem–Noether theorem, which states that any two embeddings of an extension of a field k into a finite-dimensional central simple algebra over k are conjugate. The Brauer–Noether theorem gives a characterization of the splitting fields of a central division algebra over a field.

== Legacy ==
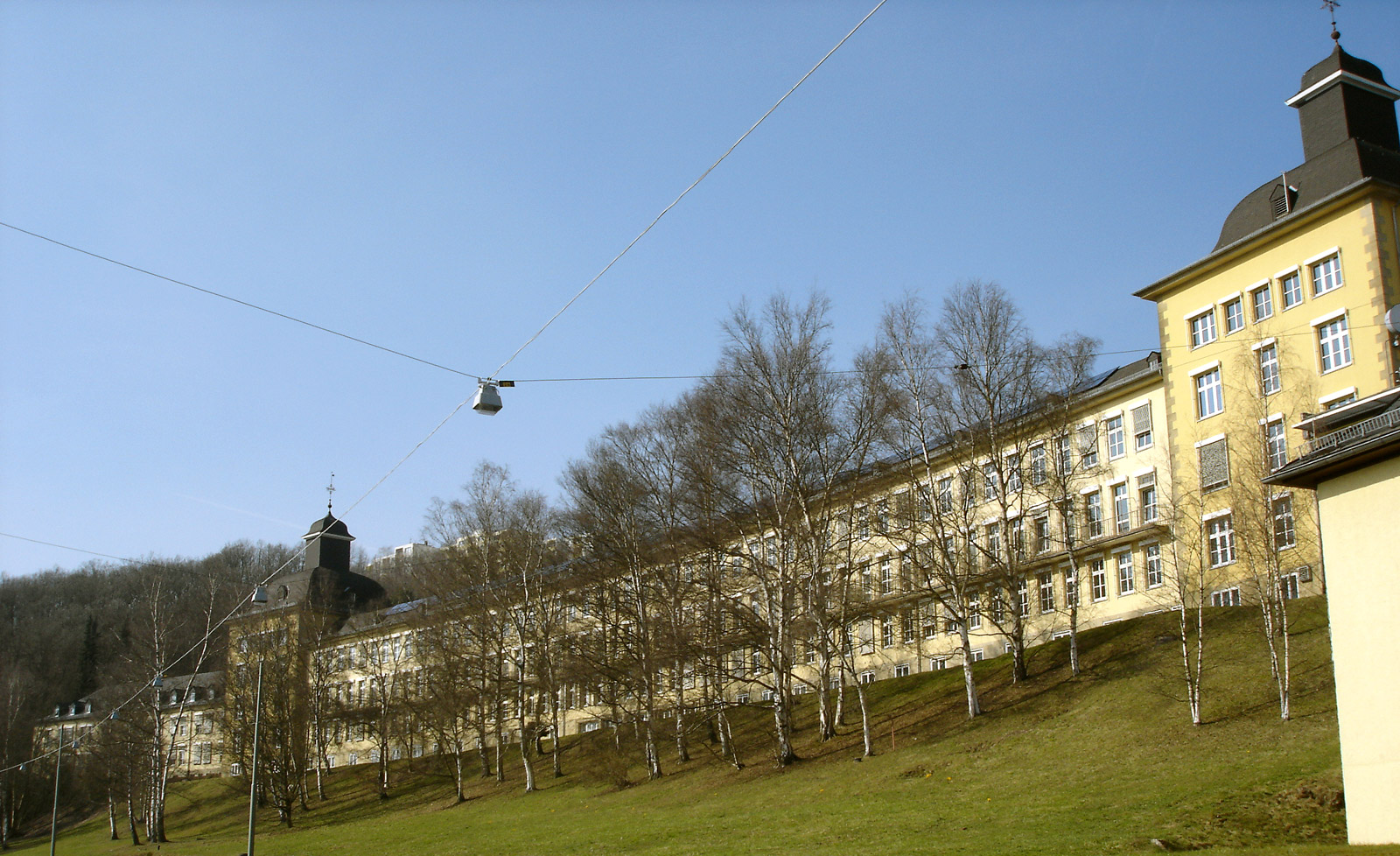
The Emmy–Noether–Campus at the University of Siegen is home to its mathematics and physics departments.

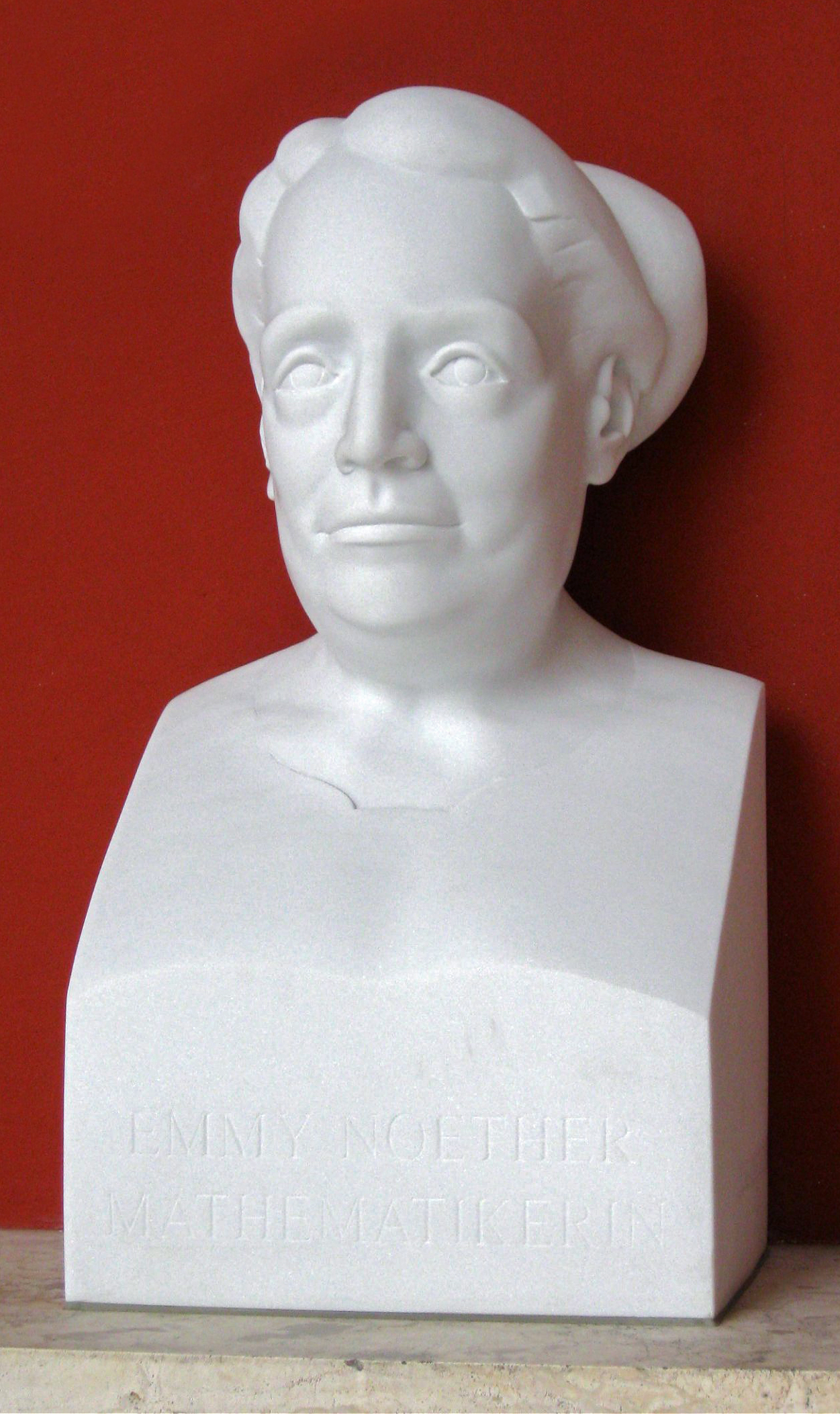
Noether is one of the carved stone busts displayed in Germany's Ruhmeshalle München (or Munich Hall of Fame in English).

Noether's work continues to be relevant for the development of theoretical physics and mathematics, and she is considered one of the most important mathematicians of the 20th century. She has been called the greatest woman mathematician in recorded history by mathematicians such as Pavel Alexandrov, Hermann Weyl, and Jean Dieudonné.

In a letter to The New York Times, Albert Einstein wrote:

In the judgment of the most competent living mathematicians, Fräulein Noether was the most significant creative mathematical genius thus far produced since the higher education of women began. In the realm of algebra, in which the most gifted mathematicians have been busy for centuries, she discovered methods which have proved of enormous importance in the development of the present-day younger generation of mathematicians.

In his obituary, algebraist B. L. van der Waerden wrote that her mathematical originality was "absolute beyond comparison", and Weyl said that Noether "changed the face of [abstract] algebra by her work". Mathematician and historian Jeremy Gray wrote that all textbooks on abstract algebra bear the evidence of Noether's contributions: "Mathematicians simply do ring theory her way." Several things now bear her name, including many mathematical objects, and an asteroid, 7001 Noether. In 2019 Time created 89 new covers to celebrate women of the year starting from 1920; it chose Noether for 1921.

== See also ==
- Timeline of women in science
- List of second-generation mathematicians

== Sources ==
- Alexandrov, Pavel S. (1981), "In Memory of Emmy Noether", in Brewer, James W; Smith, Martha K. (eds.), Emmy Noether: A Tribute to Her Life and Work, New York: Marcel Dekker, pp. 99–111, ISBN 978-0-8247-1550-2, OCLC 7837628
- Atiyah, Michael; MacDonald, Ian G. (1994), Introduction to Commutative Algebra, Addison-Wesley and Avalon Publishing, ISBN 978-0201407518
- Byers, Nina (December 1996), E. Noether's Discovery of the Deep Connection Between Symmetries and Conservation Laws, Proceedings of a Symposium on the Heritage of Emmy Noether, Israel: Bar-Ilan University, arXiv:physics/9807044, Bibcode:1998physics...7044B
- Byers, Nina (2006), "Emmy Noether", in Byers, Nina; Williams, Gary (eds.), Out of the Shadows: Contributions of 20th Century Women to Physics, Cambridge University Press, ISBN 978-0-521-82197-1
- Cox, David A.; Little, John B.; O'Shea, Donal (2015), Ideals, Varieties, and Algorithms: An Introduction to Computational Algebraic Geometry and Commutative Algebra, Undergraduate Texts in Mathematics (4th ed.), Springer, doi:10.1007/978-3-319-16721-3, ISBN 978-3-319-16721-3
- Deuring, Max (1932), "Zur arithmetischen Theorie der algebraischen Funktionen" [On the Arithmetic Theory of Algebraic Functions], Mathematische Annalen (in German), 106 (1): 77–102, doi:10.1007/BF01455878
- Dick, Auguste (1981), Emmy Noether: 1882–1935, translated by Blocher, H.I., Boston: Birkhäuser, doi:10.1007/978-1-4684-0535-4, ISBN 978-3-7643-3019-4
- Ding, Shisun; Kang, Ming-Chang; Tan, Eng-Tjioe (1999), "Chiungtze C. Tsen (1898–1940) and Tsen's theorems", Rocky Mountain Journal of Mathematics, 29 (4): 1237–1269, doi:10.1216/rmjm/1181070406, ISSN 0035-7596, MR 1743370
- Dieudonné, Jean A.; Carrell, James B. (1970), "Invariant theory, old and new", Advances in Mathematics, 4 (1): 1–80, doi:10.1016/0001-8708(70)90015-0, ISSN 0001-8708, MR 0255525
- Dörnte, Wilhelm (1929), "Untersuchungen über einen verallgemeinerten Gruppenbegriff" [Investigations on a generalised conception of groups], Mathematische Zeitschrift (in German), 29 (1): 1–19, doi:10.1007/BF01180515
- Falckenberg, Hans (1912), Verzweigungen von Lösungen nichtlinearer Differentialgleichungen [Ramifications of Solutions of Nonlinear Differential Equations] (PhD thesis) (in German)
- Fitting, Hans (1933), "Die Theorie der Automorphismenringe Abelscher Gruppen und ihr Analogon bei nicht kommutativen Gruppen" [The Theory of Automorphism-Rings of Abelian Groups and Their Analogs in Noncommutative Groups], Mathematische Annalen (in German), 107 (1): 514–542, doi:10.1007/BF01448909
- Fleischmann, Peter (2000), "The Noether bound in invariant theory of finite groups", Advances in Mathematics, 156 (1): 23–32, doi:10.1006/aima.2000.1952, MR 1800251
- Fogarty, John (2001), "On Noether's bound for polynomial invariants of a finite group", Electronic Research Announcements of the American Mathematical Society, 7 (2): 5–7, doi:10.1090/S1079-6762-01-00088-9, MR 1826990
- Gilmer, Robert (1981), "Commutative Ring Theory", in Brewer, James W.; Smith, Martha K. (eds.), Emmy Noether: A Tribute to Her Life and Work, New York: Marcel Dekker, pp. 131–143, ISBN 978-0-8247-1550-2
- Givant, Steven; Halmos, Paul Richard (2009), Introduction to Boolean Algebras, Springer, ISBN 978-0-387-40293-2
- Goodearl, Ken R.; Warfield Jr., R. B. (2004), An Introduction to Noncommutative Noetherian Rings, London Mathematical Society Student Texts (2nd ed.), Cambridge University Press, ISBN 978-0-511-21192-8
- Gordan, Paul (1870), "Die simultanen Systeme binärer Formen", Mathematische Annalen (in German), 2 (2): 227–280, doi:10.1007/BF01444021, S2CID 119558943, archived from the original on 3 September 2014
- Gowers, Timothy; Barrow-Green, June; Leader, Imre, eds. (2008), The Princeton Companion to Mathematics, Princeton University Press, ISBN 978-0-691-11880-2
- Gray, Jeremy (2018), A History of Abstract Algebra, Springer Undergraduate Mathematics Series, Springer, doi:10.1007/978-3-319-94773-0, ISBN 978-3-319-94772-3
- Grell, Heinrich (1927), "Beziehungen zwischen den Idealen verschiedener Ringe" [Relationships between the Ideals of Various Rings], Mathematische Annalen (in German), 97 (1): 490–523, doi:10.1007/BF01447879
- Haboush, William J. (1975), "Reductive groups are geometrically reductive", Annals of Mathematics, 102 (1): 67–83, doi:10.2307/1970974, JSTOR 1970974
- Hasse, Helmut (1933), "Die Struktur der R. Brauerschen Algebrenklassengruppe über einem algebraischen Zahlkörper", Mathematische Annalen (in German), 107 (1): 731–760, doi:10.1007/BF01448916, S2CID 128305900, archived from the original on 5 March 2016
- Hartshorne, Robin (1977), Algebraic Geometry, Graduate Texts in Mathematics, Berlin, New York: Springer-Verlag, ISBN 978-0-387-90244-9, MR 0463157, Zbl 0367.14001
- Hermann, Grete (1926), "Die Frage der endlich vielen Schritte in der Theorie der Polynomideale. (Unter Benutzung nachgelassener Sätze von K. Hentzelt)" [The Question of the Finite Number of Steps in the Theory of Ideals of Polynomials. (Using Theorems of the Late Kurt Hentzelt)], Mathematische Annalen (in German), 95 (1): 736–788, doi:10.1007/BF01206635
- Hilbert, David (December 1890), "Ueber die Theorie der algebraischen Formen", Mathematische Annalen (in German), 36 (4): 473–534, doi:10.1007/BF01208503, S2CID 179177713, archived from the original on 3 September 2014
- Hilton, Peter (1988), "A Brief, Subjective History of Homology and Homotopy Theory in this Century", Mathematics Magazine, 60 (5): 282–291, doi:10.1080/0025570X.1988.11977391, JSTOR 2689545
- Hölzer, Rudolf (1927), "Zur Theorie der primären Ringe" [On the Theory of Primary Rings], Mathematische Annalen (in German), 96 (1): 719–735, doi:10.1007/BF01209197
- Hopf, Heinz (1928), "Eine Verallgemeinerung der Euler-Poincaréschen Formel", Nachrichten von der Gesellschaft der Wissenschaften zu Göttingen. Mathematisch-Physikalische Klasse (in German), 2: 127–136
- Hubbard, John H.; West, Beverly H. (1991), Differential Equations: A Dynamical Systems Approach. Part II: Higher-Dimensional Systems, Texts in Applied Mathematics, vol. 5, Springer, ISBN 978-0-38-794377-0
- James, Ioan (2002), "Emmy Noether (1882–1935)", Remarkable Mathematicians from Euler to von Neumann, Cambridge: Cambridge University Press, pp. 321–326, ISBN 978-0-521-81777-6
- Kimberling, Clark (1981), "Emmy Noether and Her Influence", in Brewer, James W.; Smith, Martha K. (eds.), Emmy Noether: A Tribute to Her Life and Work, New York: Marcel Dekker, pp. 3–61, ISBN 978-0-8247-1550-2
- Kimberling, Clark (March 1982), "Emmy Noether, Greatest Woman Mathematician" (PDF), Mathematics Teacher, 84 (3), Reston, Virginia: National Council of Teachers of Mathematics: 246–249, doi:10.5951/MT.75.3.0246, archived from the original (PDF) on 9 October 2022
- Kosmann-Schwarzbach, Yvette (2011), The Noether Theorems: Invariance and Conservation Laws in the Twentieth Century, Sources and Studies in the History of Mathematics and Physical Sciences, translated by Schwarzbach, Bertram Eugene, Springer, doi:10.1007/978-0-387-87868-3, ISBN 978-0-387-87867-6
- Lam, Tsit Yuen (1981), "Representation Theory", in Brewer, James W.; Smith, Martha K. (eds.), Emmy Noether: A Tribute to Her Life and Work, New York: Marcel Dekker, pp. 145–156, ISBN 978-0-8247-1550-2
- Lang, Serge (2002), Algebra (3rd ed.), Springer-Verlag, ISBN 978-1-4613-0041-0
- Lang, Serge (2005), Undergraduate Algebra (3rd ed.), Berlin, New York: Springer-Verlag, ISBN 978-0-387-22025-3
- Lederman, Leon M.; Hill, Christopher T. (2004), Symmetry and the Beautiful Universe, Amherst: Prometheus Books, ISBN 978-1-59102-242-8
- Levitzki, Jakob (1931), "Über vollständig reduzible Ringe und Unterringe" [On Completely Reducible Rings and Subrings], Mathematische Zeitschrift (in German), 33 (1): 663–691, doi:10.1007/BF01174374
- Mac Lane, Saunders (1981), "Mathematics at the University of Göttingen 1831–1933", in Brewer, James W.; Smith, Martha K. (eds.), Emmy Noether: A Tribute to Her Life and Work, New York: Marcel Dekker, pp. 65–78, ISBN 978-0-8247-1550-2
- Malle, Gunter; Matzat, Bernd Heinrich (1999), Inverse Galois theory, Springer Monographs in Mathematics, Berlin, New York: Springer-Verlag, ISBN 978-3-540-62890-3, MR 1711577
- Merzbach, Uta C. (1983), "Emmy Noether: Historical Contexts", in Srinivasan, Bhama; Sally, Judith D. (eds.), Emmy Noether in Bryn Mawr: Proceedings of a Symposium Sponsored by the Association for Women in Mathematics in Honor of Emmy Noether's 100th Birthday, New York, NY: Springer, pp. 161–171, doi:10.1007/978-1-4612-5547-5_12, ISBN 978-1-4612-5547-5
- McLarty, Colin (2005), "Poor Taste as a Bright Character Trait: Emmy Noether and the Independent Social Democratic Party" (PDF), Science in Context, 18 (3): 429–450, doi:10.1017/S0269889705000608
- Noether, Gottfried E. (1987), Grinstein, L.S.; Campbell, P.J. (eds.), Women of Mathematics, New York: Greenwood Press, ISBN 978-0-313-24849-8
- Noether, Max (1914), "Paul Gordan", Mathematische Annalen, 75 (1): 1–41, doi:10.1007/BF01564521, S2CID 179178051, archived from the original on 4 September 2014
- Ogilvie, Marilyn; Harvey, Joy (2000), The Biographical Dictionary of Women in Science: Pioneering Lives from Ancient Times to the Mid-Twentieth Century, vol. 2 (L–Z), New York and London: Routledge, ISBN 978-0-2038-0145-1
- Osofsky, Barbara L. (1994), "Noether Lasker Primary Decomposition Revisited", The American Mathematical Monthly, 101 (8): 759–768, doi:10.1080/00029890.1994.11997022
- Peres, Asher (1993), Quantum Theory: Concepts and Methods, Kluwer, ISBN 0-7923-2549-4
- Reid, Constance (1996), Hilbert, New York: Springer, ISBN 0-387-94674-8
- Roquette, Peter (2005), The Brauer–Hasse–Noether theorem in historical perspective, Schriften der Mathematisch-Naturwissenschaftlichen Klasse der Heidelberger Akademie der Wissenschaften, vol. 15, MR 2222818, Zbl 1060.01009
- Rowe, David E. (2021), Emmy Noether – Mathematician Extraordinaire, Cham, Switzerland: Springer, ISBN 978-3-030-63810-8
- Rowe, David E.; Koreuber, Mechthild (2020), Proving It Her Way: Emmy Noether, a Life in Mathematics, Cham, Switzerland: Springer, ISBN 978-3-030-62811-6
- Schmadel, Lutz D. (2003), Dictionary of Minor Planet Names (5th revised and enlarged ed.), Berlin: Springer-Verlag, ISBN 978-3-540-00238-3
- Schur, Issai (1968), Grunsky, Helmut (ed.), Vorlesungen über Invariantentheorie, Berlin, New York: Springer-Verlag, ISBN 978-3-540-04139-9, MR 0229674
- Segal, Sanford L. (2003), Mathematicians Under the Nazis (illustrated ed.), Princeton University Press, ISBN 978-0-69-100451-8
- Seidelmann, Fritz (1917), "Die Gesamtheit der kubischen und biquadratischen Gleichungen mit Affekt bei beliebigem Rationalitätsbereich" [Complete Set of Cubic and Biquadratic Equations with Affect in an Arbitrary Rationality Domain], Mathematische Annalen (in German), 78 (1–4): 230–233, doi:10.1007/BF01457100, hdl:2027/uc1.b2611861
- Schilling, Otto (1935), "Über gewisse Beziehungen zwischen der Arithmetik hyperkomplexer Zahlsysteme und algebraischer Zahlkörper" [On Certain Relationships between the Arithmetic of Hypercomplex Number Systems and Algebraic Number Fields], Mathematische Annalen (in German), 111 (1): 372–398, doi:10.1007/BF01472227
- Stauffer, Ruth (July 1936), "The Construction of a Normal Basis in a Separable Normal Extension Field", American Journal of Mathematics, 58 (3): 585–597, doi:10.2307/2370977, JSTOR 2370977
- Stewart, Ian (2015), Galois Theory (4th ed.), CRC Press, ISBN 978-1-4822-4582-0
- Swan, Richard G (1969), "Invariant rational functions and a problem of Steenrod", Inventiones Mathematicae, 7 (2): 148–158, Bibcode:1969InMat...7..148S, doi:10.1007/BF01389798, S2CID 121951942
- Taussky, Olga (1981), "My Personal Recollections of Emmy Noether", in Brewer, James W.; Smith, Martha K (eds.), Emmy Noether: A Tribute to Her Life and Work, New York: Marcel Dekker, pp. 79–92, ISBN 978-0-8247-1550-2
- Taylor, John R. (2005), Classical Mechanics, University Science Books, ISBN 978-1-8913-8922-1
- Teicher, Mina, ed. (1999), The Heritage of Emmy Noether, Israel Mathematical Conference Proceedings, Bar-Ilan University, American Mathematical Society, Oxford University Press, ISBN 978-0-19-851045-1, OCLC 223099225
- Tsen, Chiungtze C. (1933), "Divisionsalgebren über Funktionenkörpern" [Division Algebras over Function Fields], Nachrichten von der Gesellschaft der Wissenschaften zu Göttingen, Mathematisch-Physikalische Klasse (in German), 1933: 335–339
- van der Waerden, B. L. (1935), "Nachruf auf Emmy Noether" [Obituary of Emmy Noether], Mathematische Annalen (in German), 111 (1): 469–474, doi:10.1007/BF01472233, S2CID 179178055. Reprinted in Dick 1981.
- ——— (1985), A History of Algebra: from al-Khwārizmī to Emmy Noether, Berlin: Springer-Verlag, doi:10.1007/978-3-642-51599-6, ISBN 978-0-387-13610-3
- Weber, Werner (December 1930), "Idealtheoretische Deutung der Darstellbarkeit beliebiger natürlicher Zahlen durch quadratische Formen" [Ideal-theoretic Interpretation of the Representability of Arbitrary Natural Numbers by Quadratic Forms], Mathematische Annalen (in German), 102 (1): 740–767, doi:10.1007/BF01782375
- Weyl, Hermann (1935), "Emmy Noether", Scripta Mathematica, 3 (3): 201–220. Reprinted as an appendix in Dick (1981).
- ——— (1944), "David Hilbert and his mathematical work", Bulletin of the American Mathematical Society, 50 (9): 612–654, doi:10.1090/S0002-9904-1944-08178-0, MR 0011274
- Wichmann, Wolfgang (1936), "Anwendungen der p-adischen Theorie im Nichtkommutativen" [Applications of the p-adic Theory in Noncommutative Algebras], Monatshefte für Mathematik (in German), 44 (1): 203–224, doi:10.1007/BF01699316
- Witt, Ernst (1935), "Riemann-Rochscher Satz und Z-Funktion im Hyperkomplexen" [The Riemann-Roch Theorem and Zeta Function in Hypercomplex Numbers], Mathematische Annalen (in German), 110 (1): 12–28, doi:10.1007/BF01448015
- Zee, Anthony (2016), Group Theory in a Nutshell for Physicists, Princeton University Press, ISBN 978-0-691-16269-0

=== Selected works by Emmy Noether ===
- Noether, Emmy (1908), "Über die Bildung des Formensystems der ternären biquadratischen Form" [On Complete Systems of Invariants for Ternary Biquadratic Forms], Journal für die Reine und Angewandte Mathematik (in German), 1908 (134), DE: 23–90 and two tables, doi:10.1515/crll.1908.134.23, S2CID 119967160, archived from the original on 8 March 2013
- ——— (1913), "Rationale Funktionenkörper" [Rational Function Fields], J. Ber. D. DMV (in German), 22: 316–319, archived from the original on 8 March 2013
- ——— (1915), "Der Endlichkeitssatz der Invarianten endlicher Gruppen" [The Finiteness Theorem for Invariants of Finite Groups] (PDF), Mathematische Annalen (in German), 77 (1): 89–92, doi:10.1007/BF01456821, S2CID 121213008
- ——— (1918), "Gleichungen mit vorgeschriebener Gruppe" [Equations with Prescribed Group], Mathematische Annalen (in German), 78 (1–4): 221–229, doi:10.1007/BF01457099, S2CID 122353858, archived from the original on 3 September 2014
- ——— (1918b), "Invariante Variationsprobleme" [Invariant Variation Problems], Nachr. D. König. Gesellsch. D. Wiss. (in German), 918 (3), translated by Tavel, M.A., Göttingen: 235–257, arXiv:physics/0503066, Bibcode:1971TTSP....1..186N, doi:10.1080/00411457108231446, S2CID 119019843
- ——— (1918c), "Invariante Variationsprobleme" [Invariant Variation Problems], Nachr. D. König. Gesellsch. D. Wiss. (in German), 918, Göttingen: 235–257, archived from the original on 5 July 2008 Original German image with link to Tavel's English translation
- ——— (1921), "Idealtheorie in Ringbereichen" [The Theory of Ideals in Ring Domains], Mathematische Annalen (in German), 83 (1): 24–66, Bibcode:1921MatAn..83...24N, doi:10.1007/bf01464225, S2CID 121594471, archived from the original (PDF) on 3 September 2014
- ——— (1923), "Zur Theorie der Polynomideale und Resultanten" (PDF), Mathematische Annalen (in German), 88 (1–2): 53–79, doi:10.1007/BF01448441, S2CID 122226025
- ——— (1923b), "Eliminationstheorie und allgemeine Idealtheorie" (PDF), Mathematische Annalen (in German), 90 (3–4), Germany: 229–261, doi:10.1007/BF01455443, S2CID 121239880
- ——— (1924), "Eliminationstheorie und Idealtheorie", Jahresbericht der Deutschen Mathematiker-Vereinigung (in German), 33: 116–120, archived from the original on 8 March 2013
- ——— (1926), "Der Endlichkeitsatz der Invarianten endlicher linearer Gruppen der Charakteristik p" [Proof of the Finiteness of the Invariants of Finite Linear Groups of Characteristic p], Nachr. Ges. Wiss (in German): 28–35, archived from the original on 8 March 2013
- ——— (1926b), "Ableitung der Elementarteilertheorie aus der Gruppentheorie" [Derivation of the Theory of Elementary Divisor from Group Theory], Jahresbericht der Deutschen Mathematiker-Vereinigung (in German), 34 (Abt. 2): 104, archived from the original on 8 March 2013
- ——— (1927), "Abstrakter Aufbau der Idealtheorie in algebraischen Zahl- und Funktionenkörpern" [Abstract Structure of the Theory of Ideals in Algebraic Number Fields], Mathematische Annalen (in German), 96 (1): 26–61, doi:10.1007/BF01209152, S2CID 121288299, archived from the original (PDF) on 3 September 2014
- Brauer, Richard; Noether, Emmy (1927), "Über minimale Zerfällungskörper irreduzibler Darstellungen" [On the Minimum Splitting Fields of Irreducible Representations], Sitz. Ber. D. Preuss. Akad. D. Wiss. (in German): 221–228
- Noether, Emmy (1929), "Hyperkomplexe Größen und Darstellungstheorie" [Hypercomplex Quantities and the Theory of Representations], Mathematische Annalen (in German), 30 (1): 641–692, doi:10.1007/BF01187794, S2CID 120464373, archived from the original on 29 March 2016
- Brauer, Richard; Hasse, Helmut; Noether, Emmy (1932), "Beweis eines Hauptsatzes in der Theorie der Algebren" [Proof of a Main Theorem in the Theory of Algebras], Journal für die Reine und Angewandte Mathematik (in German), 1932 (167): 399–404, doi:10.1515/crll.1932.167.399, S2CID 199545542
- Noether, Emmy (1933), "Nichtkommutative Algebren" [Noncommutative Algebras], Mathematische Zeitschrift (in German), 37 (1): 514–541, doi:10.1007/BF01474591, S2CID 186227754
- ——— (1983), Jacobson, Nathan (ed.), Gesammelte Abhandlungen [Collected Papers] (in German), Berlin; New York: Springer-Verlag, pp. viii, 777, ISBN 978-3-540-11504-5, MR 0703862
