= Werner Weber (mathematician) =

German mathematician and Nazi

- Born: 3 January 1906; Oberstein, German Empire
- Died: 2 February 1975 (aged 69)
- Education: University of Göttingen
- Scientific career
- Fields: Mathematics
- Workplaces: University of Göttingen; Heidelberg University
- Thesis: Idealtheoretische Deutung der Darstellbarkeit beliebiger natürlicher Zahlen durch quadratische Formen (1930)
- Doctoral advisor: Emmy Noether; Edmund Landau

Werner Weber (3 January 1906 – 2 February 1975) was a German mathematician. He was one of the Noether boys, the doctoral students of Emmy Noether. Considered scientifically gifted but a modest mathematician, he was also an ardent Nazi, who would later take part in driving Jewish mathematicians out of the University of Göttingen.

He later started work as part of a group of five mathematicians, recruited by Wilhelm Fenner, and which included Ernst Witt, Georg Aumann, Alexander Aigner, Oswald Teichmueller and Johann Friedrich Schultze, and led by Wolfgang Franz, to form the backbone of the new mathematical research department in the late 1930s, which would eventually be called: Section IVc of Cipher Department of the High Command of the Wehrmacht (abbr. OKW/Chi).

== Life ==
Weber was born in 1906 in Oberstein (near Hamburg, Germany), the son of a merchant. In 1924, he graduated from the Abitur. He studied mathematics in Hamburg and at the University of Göttingen and in 1928 he handed over the Lehramt staatsexamen (state examination) in Mathematics, Physics, Biology. Weber took his examination for promotion of Dr. phil. in Göttingen with Emmy Noether, (who was described by Pavel Alexandrov, Albert Einstein, Jean Dieudonné, Hermann Weyl, and Norbert Wiener as the most important woman in the history of mathematics), with a dissertation titled: Ideal theoretical interpretation of the representability of any natural numbers by square forms, (German: Idealtheoretische Deutung der Darstellbarkeit beliebiger natürlicher Zahlen durch quadratische Formen) Noether had not been authorized to supervise dissertations on her own.

In Göttingen, his postdoctoral scholarship was co-sponsored by Edmund Landau in 1931, with whom he had been an assistant since 1928 and whom he represented in 1933 after his leave of absence. Landau and Noether had judged his dissertation to be excellent, but Weber was only a mediocre mathematician, and his usefulness for Landau consisted chiefly of his abilities in accurate proofreading, to which Landau devoted much attention (according to an anecdote which was then prevalent, he was able to distinguish between an Italic point and a Roman point). In 1933, Oswald Teichmüller convinced Weber to convert to Nazism.

He was involved in the publication of the Deutsche Mathematik and published a book on the Pell equation.

From 1946, Weber worked as a publishing director in Hamburg and from 1951 at the private school "Institut Dr. Brechtefeld" in Hamburg as a teacher. He left a detailed manuscript (written down before 1940) about his discussion with Hasse, which serves as an important source for the events at that time in Göttingen.

== Nazi Biography ==
Weber was a member of the SA, but only became a Nazi on 1 May 1933 when he was given the Nazi party number 3,118,177. In November 1933, he signed the Vow of allegiance of the Professors of the German Universities and High-Schools to Adolf Hitler and the National Socialistic State.

=== Removal of Jewish mathematicians ===
Weber was involved in the removal of the Jewish mathematician Edmund Landau on 2 November 1933 from the mathematics faculty at the University of Göttingen. Richard Courant was also forced out of Göttingen in May 1933. As the leader of a group of pro-Nazi students Weber, along with the Nazi mathematician Oswald Teichmüller, along with the SS, organized a group that commanded a boycott of Edmund Landau's lectures. In a letter that Richard Courant wrote to Abraham Flexner, he stated:

[There] were some seventy students, partly in SS uniforms, but inside [the lecture theatre] not a soul. Every student who wanted to enter was prevented from entering by Weber.

Teichmüller told Landau that "Aryan students want Aryan mathematics...and requested that he refrain from giving [any more] lectures." Landau left the university soon after.

=== Mathematical Institute ===
On 13 February 1934 the university dean asked Weber, who was acting director of the mathematical institute at Göttingen, for recommendations on who should replace Hermann Weyl as new operational director. Several days later Weber recommended, as the best mathematician, the algebraist Helmut Hasse, then working at the University of Marburg, and Udo Wegner as his second choice. In 1940, Weber would write:

On the morning of 25 April 1933, I sank into gloomy brooding over how to save German mathematics. According to Weber: The tradition of Felix Klein that had been destroyed by the Jews, could only be awakened to a new life by one man: Wegner

The decision was made by the Nazi Theodor Vahlen, who appointed Helmut Hasse in April 1934. The Nazi were unsure if Hasse was fully committed to National Socialist policies, and tried to appoint someone to a second chair at Göttingen who was a firm Nazi supporter. Udo Wegner was a strong candidate, but the probability theorist Erhard Tornier and ardent Nazi, eventually gained the second chair.

Later Weber and other convinced national socialists, met in Göttingen with the designated new head of the Göttingen mathematical institute Helmut Hasse, who also sympathized with the Nazis, to question him about his ancestry, where Weber and his cronies did not consider him reliable for party politics, due to him having a Jewish grandmother. Although Hasse was acceptable to the Nazis, he was not acceptable to Weber, who refused to hand over the keys to the institute. Hasse eventually assumed directorship in July 1934 and Weber was forced to leave Göttingen. Weber found a position as an associate professor at Heidelberg University where he would remain until the end of the war.

In 1940, Weber sent a document of over 400 pages to Rudolf Mentzel of the Reich Ministry for Science Education and Adult Education and Theodor Vahlen on the events. Mentzel told Weber he should have waited until after the war before bringing this matter up and considered the matter temporarily closed.

In 1945, Weber was dismissed due to his Nazi involvement. He struggled to find work, but eventually found a job working for a publisher in Hamburg.

== War work ==
During World War II, he worked with Oswald Teichmüller in the Cipher Department of the High Command of the Wehrmacht in section IVc under Wolfgang Franz which was scientific decoding of enemy crypts, the development of code-breaking methods and working on re-cyphering systems not solved by practical decoding. The agency was managed by Erich Hüttenhain. He successfully deciphered a cypher of the Japanese diplomatic service. He also worked on cryptanalytic theory.
