= Marie Johanna Weiss =

American mathematician (1903–1952)

- Born: September 21, 1903; Eugene, California
- Died: August 19, 1952 (aged 48); San Francisco, California
- Burial place: Stockton, California
- Education: Stanford University
- Occupations: Mathematician, professor
- Known for: First Stanford woman PhD in mathematics

Marie Johanna Weiss (September 21, 1903 – August 19, 1952) was an American mathematician, university professor and textbook author. In 1927, she became the first woman to earn a PhD in mathematics from Stanford University.

== Life and work ==
Weiss was born in Eugene, California, the youngest of three surviving children of Alice Hedwig (Buschke) and Frederick Weiss, both German emigrants. She attended public high schools in Stockton, California, before enrolling at Stanford University in 1921. In the summer of 1924, after her junior year, she was an assistant instructor in a mathematics class there. She was accepted into the honorary society Phi Beta Kappa and graduated in 1925 with a bachelor's degree in mathematics with distinction. The following year she studied at Radcliffe College (now Harvard), where she received her master's degree in 1926. She returned to Stanford on a university scholarship and taught functional theory. There, she completed her doctorate with William Albert Manning; her dissertation was titled: Primitive Groups Which Contain Substitutions of Prime Order p and of Degree 6p or 7p. The dissertation is dated August 1927, and she received her PhD in June 1928.

She received a National Research Council Fellowship and studied at the University of Chicago in 1928 and 1929. From 1930 to 1936 she was an assistant professor in the mathematics department at the H. Sophie Newcomb Memorial College at Tulane University in New Orleans, Louisiana. In 1934 and 1935 she went on leave to do research at Bryn Mawr College as an Emmy Noether Fellow. She joined other female doctoral and postgraduate mathematicians there, Ruth Stauffer, Grace Shover Quinn and Olga Taussky-Todd, who all studied with esteemed mathematician Emmy Noether. After two years as an assistant professor at Vassar College, she returned in 1938 to H. Sophie Newcomb Memorial College as a professor.

From 1950 to 1952, she served the Mathematical Association of America as governor-at-large.

Marie Weiss began suffering from an unknown illness in early 1952. As she became increasingly ill, she visited her mother and brother in Visalia, California, in the summer of 1952, but her illness worsened. She was taken to the Langley Porter Clinic in San Francisco, where she died August 19, 1952, at the age of 48, from congestive heart failure resulting from bacterial endocarditis. A lifelong Lutheran, she was buried in Stockton, California.

In her honor, the Marie J. Weiss Memorial Scholarship Fund was established at Newcomb College in 1952.

== Memberships ==
According to Green, Weiss was active in several organizations.

- American Mathematical Society
- Phi Beta Kappa
- Mathematical Association of America
- Sigma Delta Epsilon
- American Association of University Women
- American Association of University Professors
- Sigma Xi

== Selected publications ==
Weiss's Algebra textbook became known as "an important text."

- 1928: "Primitive groups which contain substitutions of prime order p and of degree 6p or 7p." Transactions of the American Mathematical Society. 30: 333–59
- 1930: "The limit of transitivity of a substitution group." Trans. Amer. Math. Soc. 32: 262–83
- 1931: "Review of Elementary Theory of Finite Groups, by LC Mathewson." American Mathematical Monthly 38: 279–80.
- 1934: "On simply transitive primitive groups." Bulletin of the American Mathematical Society 40: 401–405
- 1936: "Fundamental systems of units in normal fields." American Journal of Mathematics 58: 249–54
- 1939: "Algebra for the undergraduate." American Mathematical Monthly 46: 635–42
- 1940: "Genius and youth in mathematics." Sigma Delta Epsilon News. Presented to Sigma Delta Epsilon, Columbus, Ohio, 28 December 1939
- 1949: Higher Algebra for the Undergraduate. New York: John Wiley and Sons (book)
