= Barbara L. Osofsky =

American mathematician

- Born: 1937 (age 88–89)
- Citizenship: United States
- Education: Rutgers University
- Known for: Abstract algebra
- Spouse: Abraham Osofsky
- Children: 3
- Awards: Fellow of the American Mathematical Society; MAA meritorious service award
- Scientific career
- Fields: Mathematics
- Workplaces: Rutgers University
- Thesis: Homological Properties of Rings and Modules (1964)
- Doctoral advisor: Carl Clifton Faith

Barbara Langer Osofsky (born August 4, 1937) is a retired professor of mathematics at Rutgers University. Her research concerns abstract algebra. Osofsky's contributions to mathematics include her characterization of semisimple rings in terms of properties of cyclic modules. Osofsky also established a logical equivalence between the continuum hypothesis and statements about the global dimension of associative rings.

== Personal Life ==
Born as Barbara Langer, she married Abraham J. Osofsky in 1958.

== Career ==
Osofsky received her Ph.D. from Rutgers University in 1964 under the supervision of Carl Faith. She then worked at Rutgers until 2004, when she retired. She served as acting chair of the Rutgers mathematics department in 1978.

== Awards and honors ==
In 1973, Osofsky addressed a national meeting of the AMS. She was the first woman since Anna Pell Wheeler in 1927 to do so. She became the first female editor of an AMS journal in 1974 when she became the editor of Proceedings of the American Mathematical Society.

From 2000 to 2002, Osofsky served as First Vice-President of the Mathematical Association of America. In 2005, she was awarded the MAA meritorious service award.

In 2012, Osofsky became a fellow of the American Mathematical Society.

== Selected publications ==
- Osofsky, B. L. Homological properties of rings and modules (Doctoral dissertation, Rutgers University, 1964).
- Osofsky, B. L. A generalization of quasi-Frobenius rings. J. Algebra 4 1966 373–387.
- Osofsky, B. L. Rings all of whose finitely generated modules are injective. Pacific J. Math. 14 1964 645–650.
- Osofsky, B. L. Homological dimensions of modules. Vol. 12. Regional Conference Series in mathematics. American Mathematical Society (AMS), Providence, RI, 1973
- Osofsky, Barbara L.; Smith, Patrick F. Cyclic modules whose quotients have all complement submodules direct summands. J. Algebra 139 (1991), no. 2, 342–354.
