= Noetherian topological space =

Topological space in which closed subsets satisfy the descending chain condition

In mathematics, a Noetherian topological space, named for Emmy Noether, is a topological space in which closed subsets satisfy the descending chain condition. Equivalently, we could say that the open subsets satisfy the ascending chain condition, since they are the complements of the closed subsets. The Noetherian property of a topological space can also be seen as a strong compactness condition, namely that every open subset of such a space is compact, and in fact it is equivalent to the seemingly stronger statement that every subset is compact.

== Definition ==
A topological space $X$ is called Noetherian if it satisfies the descending chain condition for closed subsets: for any sequence

$$Y_1 \supseteq Y_2 \supseteq \cdots$$

of closed subsets $Y_i$ of $X$, there is an integer $m$ such that $Y_m=Y_{m+1}=\cdots.$

== Properties ==
- A topological space $X$ is Noetherian if and only if every subspace of $X$ is compact (i.e., $X$ is hereditarily compact), and if and only if every open subset of $X$ is compact.
- Every subspace of a Noetherian space is Noetherian.
- The continuous image of a Noetherian space is Noetherian.
- A finite union of Noetherian subspaces of a topological space is Noetherian.
- Every Hausdorff Noetherian space is finite with the discrete topology.

Proof: Every subset of X is compact in a Noetherian space and every compact subset is closed in a Hausdorff space; hence all subsets of X are closed and X has the discrete topology. As X is discrete and compact it must be finite.

- Every Noetherian space X has a finite number of irreducible components. If the irreducible components are $X_1,...,X_n$, then $X=X_1\cup\cdots\cup X_n$, and none of the components $X_i$ is contained in the union of the other components.

== From algebraic geometry ==
Many examples of Noetherian topological spaces come from algebraic geometry, where for the Zariski topology an irreducible set has the intuitive property that any closed proper subset has smaller dimension. Since dimension can only 'jump down' a finite number of times, and algebraic sets are made up of finite unions of irreducible sets, descending chains of Zariski closed sets must eventually be constant.

A more algebraic way to see this is that the associated ideals defining algebraic sets must satisfy the ascending chain condition. That follows because the rings of algebraic geometry, in the classical sense, are Noetherian rings. This class of examples therefore also explains the name.

If R is a commutative Noetherian ring, then Spec(R), the prime spectrum of R, is a Noetherian topological space. More generally, a Noetherian scheme is a Noetherian topological space. The converse does not hold, since there are non-Noetherian rings with only one prime ideal, so that Spec(R) is not a Noetherian scheme, but consists of exactly one point and therefore is a Noetherian space.

== Example ==
The space $\mathbb{A}^n_k$ (affine $n$-space over a field $k$) under the Zariski topology is an example of a Noetherian topological space. By properties of the ideal of a subset of $\mathbb{A}^n_k$, we know that if

$$Y_1 \supseteq Y_2 \supseteq Y_3 \supseteq \cdots$$

is a descending chain of Zariski-closed subsets, then

$$I(Y_1) \subseteq I(Y_2) \subseteq I(Y_3) \subseteq \cdots$$

is an ascending chain of ideals of $k[x_1,\ldots,x_n].$ Since $k[x_1,\ldots,x_n]$ is a Noetherian ring, there exists an integer $m$ such that

$$I(Y_m)=I(Y_{m+1})=I(Y_{m + 2})=\cdots.$$

Since $V(I(Y))$ is the closure of Y for all Y, $V(I(Y_i))=Y_i$ for all $i.$ Hence

$Y_m=Y_{m+1}=Y_{m + 2}=\cdots$ as required.
