= Ascending chain condition =

Condition in commutative algebra

In mathematics, the ascending chain condition (ACC) and descending chain condition (DCC) are finiteness properties satisfied by some algebraic structures, most importantly ideals in certain commutative rings. These conditions played an important role in the development of the structure theory of commutative rings in the works of David Hilbert, Emmy Noether, and Emil Artin. The conditions themselves can be stated in an abstract form, so that they make sense for any partially ordered set. This point of view is useful in abstract algebraic dimension theory due to Gabriel and Rentschler.

== Definition ==
A partially ordered set (poset) P is said to satisfy the ascending chain condition (ACC) if no infinite strictly ascending sequence

$$a_1 < a_2 < a_3 < \cdots$$

of elements of P exists. Equivalently, (Note: Proof: first, a strictly increasing sequence cannot stabilize, obviously. Conversely, suppose there is an ascending sequence that does not stabilize; then clearly it contains a strictly increasing (necessarily infinite) subsequence.) every weakly ascending sequence

$$a_1 \leq a_2 \leq a_3 \leq \cdots,$$

of elements of P eventually stabilizes, meaning that there exists a positive integer n such that

$$a_n = a_{n+1} = a_{n+2} = \cdots.$$

Similarly, P is said to satisfy the descending chain condition (DCC) if there is no infinite strictly descending chain of elements of P. Equivalently, every weakly descending sequence

$$a_1 \geq a_2 \geq a_3 \geq \cdots$$

of elements of P eventually stabilizes.

=== Comments ===
- Assuming the axiom of dependent choice, the descending chain condition on a (possibly infinite) poset P is equivalent to P being well-founded: every nonempty subset of P has a minimal element (also called the minimal condition or minimum condition). A totally ordered set that is well-founded is a well-ordered set.
- Similarly, the ascending chain condition is equivalent to P being converse well-founded (again, assuming dependent choice): every nonempty subset of P has a maximal element (the maximal condition or maximum condition).
- Every finite poset satisfies both the ascending and descending chain conditions, and thus is both well-founded and converse well-founded.

== Example ==
Consider the ring

$$\mathbb{Z} = \{\dots, -3, -2, -1, 0, 1, 2, 3, \dots\}$$

of integers. Each ideal of $\mathbb{Z}$ consists of all multiples of some number $n$. For example, the ideal

$$I = \{\dots, -18, -12, -6, 0, 6, 12, 18, \dots\}$$

consists of all multiples of $6$. Let

$$J = \{\dots, -6, -4, -2, 0, 2, 4, 6, \dots\}$$

be the ideal consisting of all multiples of $2$. The ideal $I$ is contained inside the ideal $J$, since every multiple of $6$ is also a multiple of $2$. In turn, the ideal $J$ is contained in the ideal $\mathbb{Z}$, since every multiple of $2$ is a multiple of $1$. However, at this point there is no larger ideal; we have "topped out" at $\mathbb{Z}$.

In general, if $I_1, I_2, I_3, \dots$ are ideals of $\mathbb{Z}$ such that $I_1$ is contained in $I_2$, $I_2$ is contained in $I_3$, and so on, then there is some $n$ for which all $I_n = I_{n+1} = I_{n+2} = \cdots$. That is, after some point all the ideals are equal to each other. Therefore, the ideals of $\mathbb{Z}$ satisfy the ascending chain condition, where ideals are ordered by set inclusion. Hence $\mathbb{Z}$ is a Noetherian ring.

== See also ==
- Artinian
- Ascending chain condition for principal ideals
- Krull dimension
- Maximal condition on congruences
- Noetherian
