= Der Beck =

Bakery chain based in Erlangen, Germany

Der Beck GmbH
- Company type: Public
- Industry: Bakery and coffee shops
- Founded: 1895 in Tennenlohe, a village south of Erlangen, Bavaria, Germany
- Founder: Family Ziegler
- Headquarters: Erlangen, Germany
- Number of locations: 140 (summer 2014)
- Area served: Germany
- Key people: Petra, Siegfried, Alexander and Dominik Beck
- Products: Bread • bread rolls • tortes • cakes • coffee • tea • pastries
- Revenue: 69 million euro (2012)
- Number of employees: 1400 (summer 2014)
- Website: www.der-beck.de (in German)

Der Beck GmbH is a bakery chain founded in 1895. It is among the top 4% of the biggest bakeries in Germany with more than 50 million euros of revenue and more than 140 locations (as of 2014) in the metropolitan area of Nuremberg. Today it is owned by Petra and Siegfried Beck, grandchildren of the founder family Ziegler.

== Awards ==
- 2006 Franconia's baker of the year (German: Frankens Bäcker des Jahres)
- 2006 Deutscher Kulturförderpreis, i.e. German development grant for culture, awarded by the Federal association of the German Industry (BDI).
- 2009 Grand Prix of the small and medium-sized enterprises (German: Großer Preis des Mittelstandes) awarded by the Oskar Patzelt foundation
- 2009 Umweltpakt Bayern - Umweltverträgliches Wirtschaftswachstum awarded by the Bavarian ministry for environment and consumer Bayerischen Staatsministeriums für Umwelt und Gesundheit)
- 2010 Axia Award in the category human resources (German: Personalmanagement)
