= Hugo Kettler =

German signals officer

Hugo Wilhelm Kettler (3 January 1895) was a German signals officer with the rank of colonel in the German Army. In October 1943, Kettler became director of the OKW/Chi, the cipher Department of the High Command of the Wehrmacht. Kettler remained in command of the unit until it was dissolved on 15 April 1945.
