= Wolfgang Franz (mathematician) =

German mathematician

- Born: 4 October 1905; Magdeburg, German Empire
- Died: 26 April 1996 (aged 90); Frankfurt, Germany
- Citizenship: German
- Education: University of Kiel
- Known for: Reidemeister–Franz torsion
- Scientific career
- Fields: Mathematics; Topology; Algebraic number theory
- Workplaces: Goethe University Frankfurt; University of Kiel; Martin Luther University of Halle-Wittenberg; University of Göttingen; University of Giessen
- Doctoral advisor: Helmut Hasse
- Doctoral students: Reinhard Selten

Wolfgang Franz (born 4 October 1905 in Magdeburg, Germany; died 26 April 1996) was a German mathematician who specialised in topology particularly in 3-manifolds, which he generalized to higher dimensions. He is known for the Reidemeister–Franz torsion. He also made important contributions to the theory of lens spaces.

During World War II Franz led a group of five mathematicians, recruited by Wilhelm Fenner, and which included Ernst Witt, Georg Aumann, Alexander Aigner, Oswald Teichmüller and Johann Friedrich Schultze, to form the backbone of the new mathematical research department in the field of cryptology, in the late 1930s. This would eventually be known as: Section IVc of Cipher Department of the High Command of the Wehrmacht (abbr. OKW/Chi). After the war, he returned to teach at the Goethe University Frankfurt and was awarded the Chair of Mathematics in 1949. In 1967 he became the Chairman of the German Mathematical Society. He became Dean of the Faculty of Science for several periods starting in 1950 before being promoted to emeritus professor in 1974.

== Life ==
Wolfgang Franz was the son of a Chief Auditor (German:Oberstudiendirektor) and studied mathematics, physics and philosophy at the University of Kiel (after his high school diploma in Kiel) with exams in Berlin, Vienna and Halle. In 1930 he passed the Lehramt examination in Kiel. He was promoted in 1930 to Dr Phil on David Hilbert's Irreduzibilitätssatz problem, with a doctoral thesis titled: Investigations on Hilbert's irreducibility (German:Untersuchungen zum Hilbertschen Irreduzibilitätssatz) in Halle, his doctoral advisor was Helmut Hasse (after he had started a dissertation with a different topic under Ernst Steinitz, but he died). Together with Hasse, Franz went to Marburg, where he was assistant to Hasse from 1930 to 1934, and remained there when Hasse received a call to the University of Göttingen in 1934. Working with Hasse, he dealt with algebraic number theory and produced a script of Hassen's lecture on class-field theory. In 1934 he joined the SA, the paramilitary wing of the Nazi Party in Nazi Germany, to increase his career chances. In 1936, Franz habilited in the field of algebraic topology under Kurt Reidemeister in Marburg. In 1937 he moved to the University of Giessen, where he taught as a lecturer from 1939 onwards.

Franz wanted to change to Frankfurt in 1940, but in the summer of 1940 he was promoted to the command post of the Wehrmacht. Nevertheless, at the request of the Faculty of Science, he was appointed an extraordinary professor in 1943.

The faculty's application states:

His work is characterized as a pattern of clarity, mastery in expression and matter, he has shown himself as a researcher of rank and is well known in his teaching abilities. As a teacher as well as a researcher, he is one of the best hopes ...

== War work ==
In the Second World War, he joined the OKW/Chi, the cipher bureau of the High Command of the Wehrmacht in 17 July 1940. He worked in Chi IVc with duties that included scientific decoding of enemy crypts, the development of code breaking methods and working on re-cyphering systems not solved by practical decoding. He had a staff of 48. From March 1941 he lived in Berlin-Zehlendorf and was released from teaching duties in Frankfurt. Franz first successfully solved Mexican and Greek codes and then the M-138-A Strip Cipher of the US Department of Foreign Affairs (named by the Germans as Am-10). An electronic machine called a clock tower was used.

== Post-war ==
He experienced the end of the war in Helmstedt and returned to Frankfurt in 1945. In the summer semester of 1946, he began teaching at the Goethe University Frankfurt, immediately after their reopening. In 1949 he received the Chair of Mathematics (as successor to William Threlfall). He was Dean of the Faculty of Science from 1950 to 1951, 1963–1964, and from 1964 to 1965 rector and from 1965 to 1967 rector. Franz was also Chairman of the German Mathematical Society in 1967. From 1971 to 1973, Franz was Dean of the newly founded Department of Mathematics at Frankfurt. During this time, he supervised about twenty PhD theses and numerous habilitations, including those of Wolfgang Haken. Franz was promoted emeritus professor in 1974, but remained active in teaching and as a lecturer of the foundation of the studies.

== Publications ==
- Topology 1, General Topology, De Gruyter, Göschen Collection, 1960, 4th Edition, 1973
  - English edition: General Topology, New York: Ungar 1965
- Topology 2, Algebraic Topology, De Gruyter, Göschen Collection, 1965, 2nd Edition 1974
  - English edition: Algebraic Topology, New York: Ungar 1968
- Supernatants of topological complexes with hypercomplex systems, Journal für die reine und angewandte Mathematik 173 (1935), 174–184.
- On the torsion of a covering, Journal für die reine und angewandte Mathematik 173 (1935), 245–254.
- Torsion ideals, torsion classes and torsion, Journal für die reine und angewandte Mathematik 176 (1936), 113–124,
- On the Twist of Manifolds, Annual Report DMV, Vol. 46, 1936, p. 171.
- Imaging classes and fixed-point classes of three-dimensional lens spaces, Journal für die reine und angewandte Mathematik 185 (1943), 65–77.
- Euclid from the perspective of the mathematical and natural sciences of the present, Frankfurter Universitätsreden, vol. 38, 1965.
- Cryptology: Construction and deciphering of secret documents, session reports of the scientific society at the Johann-Wolfgang-Goethe-University Frankfurt am Main; Vol. 24, No. 5, 1989.
- Three-dimensional and multi-dimensional geometry: the regular polytope, meeting reports of the scientific society at the Johann-Wolfgang-Goethe-University Frankfurt am Main; 9, No. 3, 1971, pp. 67–104.
- On mathematical statements, which are demonstrably demonstrable together with their negation. The incompleteness rate of Gödel, conference reports of the Scientific Society at the Johann-Wolfgang-Goethe-University Frankfurt am Main; Vol. 14, No. 1, Franz Steiner Verlag, Wiesbaden, 1977, ISBN 3-515-02612-6.
- Torsion and Symmetrical Spaces, Order of the Scientific Society at the Johann Wolfgang Goethe University, Frankfurt am Main, 1981, pp. 125–131.
