= Wilhelm Gimmler =

German signals officer

Wilhelm Gimmler (13 October 1890 in Kontschwitz; 19 August 1963 in Hamelin) was a careers signals officer, with the rank of general in German Army, who became Commander in Chief of Signals in the west OB West (German: Chef AgWNV) and Chief of the Armed Forces Signal Communications Office during World War II. Gimmler was responsible for coordinating all the cryptographic security studies undertaken by German Armed Forces and was notable for standardising wireless phraseology between different Army Groups.

== Life ==
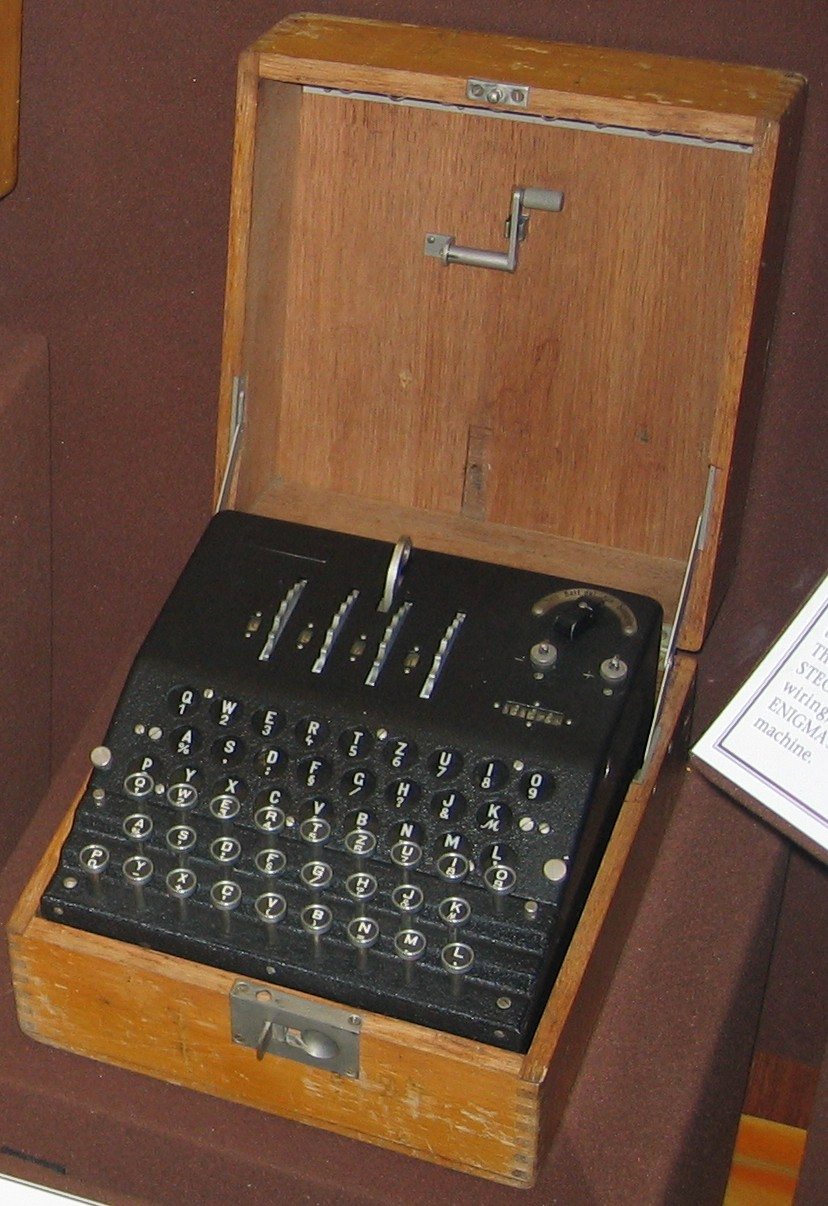
Enigma G Engima was modified with a plugboard to make the Enigma 1 introduced in June 1930

Gimmler's military career began as a young man when he was conscripted into the German Army and had attained the rank of Captain at the end of World War I. By 1933, Gimmler had obtained the rank of major in the Reichswehr and had been subordinated to the 7th Division in Munich, with responsibility for the monthly distribution of keys for the Enigma I rotor cipher machine. From October 1934 to October 1935, Gimmler was commanding officer of Korps-Nachrichten-Abteilung 41 (Intelligence Division) in Königsberg, . In October 1935 he was moved to command Nachrichten-Abteilung 41, part of the I. Army Corps in a position he held until March 1936.

In 1937, Gimmler was promoted to colonel in the Wehrmacht and transferred to Berlin. He became the main liaison between the Wehrmacht and the Heimsoeth and Rinke company who manufactured the Enigma machine, in matters relating to the further improvement to the device. From April 1936 to April 1941, Gimmler was commanding officer of intelligence department (Nachrichtengerätabteilung) (WaPrüf 7) at the German Army Weapons Agency (WaA).

On the 6 April 1941, Gimmler was promoted to Major General. From August 1942 to August 1944, Gimmler was Chief Signals Officer of Army Group D (Heeresgruppe D). On 4 September 1944 Fritz Thiele was hanged at Plötzensee Prison in Berlin. In the following month, in August 1944, Thiele was succeeded by Gimmler when he became Group Commanding Officer of Wehrmacht Communications of the Oberkommando der Wehrmacht (Chef AgWNV).

== Security conferences ==
From November 1944 to January 1945, Gimmler hosted a series of security conference known as Chi-conference, ostensibly to discuss the security of own processes and physical security. The first conference took place in late 1944 and lasted four days, one day for each subject. The subjects discussed on each day were: 1) Speech Encryption 2) Security of Teletype Cipher Machines 3) Enigma Security 4) Security of Hand Ciphers. Erich Hüttenhain chaired the conferences.

== Awards and honours ==
- 8 May 1945 Knights Cross of the War Merit Cross with Swords
- 30 October 1943 German Cross in Silver
- 1939 Clasps to the Iron Cross
- 1939 War Merit Cross 1st and 2nd Class with Swords
- 1939 Iron Cross 1st and 2nd Class 1914
- 1939 Cross of Honour
