= Tennenlohe =

- Village of Erlangen
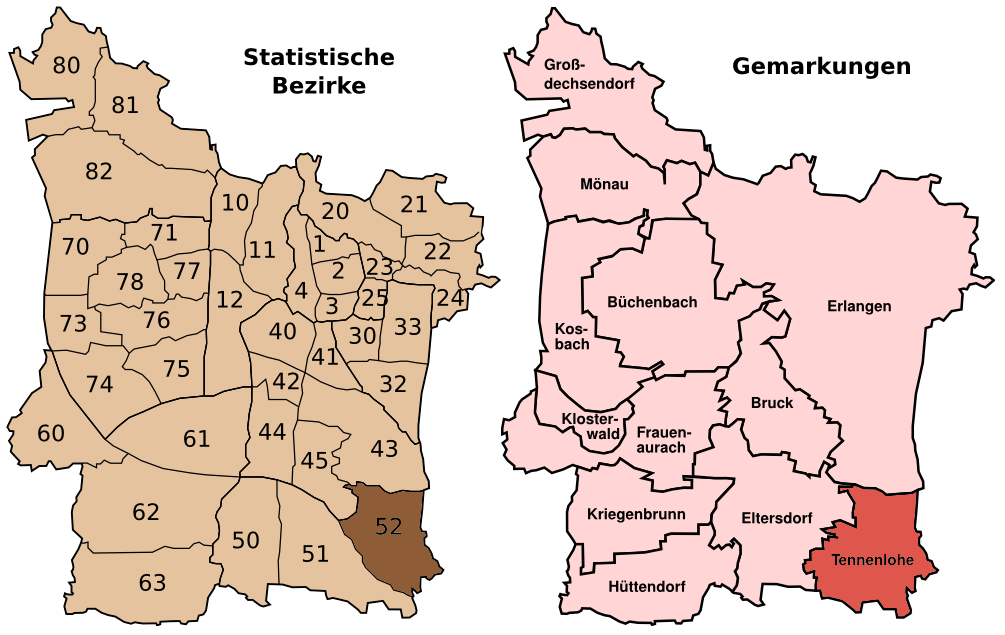
- The subdistrict of Tennenlohe as well as the statistical district 52 within the city of Erlangen.
- Interactive map of Tennenlohe
- Location within Germany Location within Bavaria
- Coordinates: 49°33′04″N 11°01′42″E
- Country: Germany
- State: Bavaria
- Admin. region: Mittelfranken
- District: Urban district
- City: Erlangen

Area
  - Total: 2.87 km^{2} (1.11 sq mi)
- Elevation: 294–312 m (965–1,024 ft)

Population (2021)
  - Total: 4,471
  - Density: 1,560/km^{2} (4,030/sq mi)
- Time zone: UTC+01:00 (CET)
  - Summer (DST): UTC+02:00 (CEST)
- Postal codes: 91058
- Dialling codes: 09131

The village of Tennenlohe, is a local subdistrict and a statistical district in the southeast part of the independent city of Erlangen in the Bavarian administrative district of Middle Franconia. Until 1972, when it was incorporated, Tennenlohe was an independent municipality in the Erlangen county. The statistical district 52, which covers a large part of the Tennenlohe district, has about 4,400 inhabitants.

The place is considered a village by the locals, however from a US- or Canadian perspective this might as well be considered a small town. In general, places that have a population of under 5,000 inhabitants are mostly considered to be a village in Germany.

== Location and surroundings ==
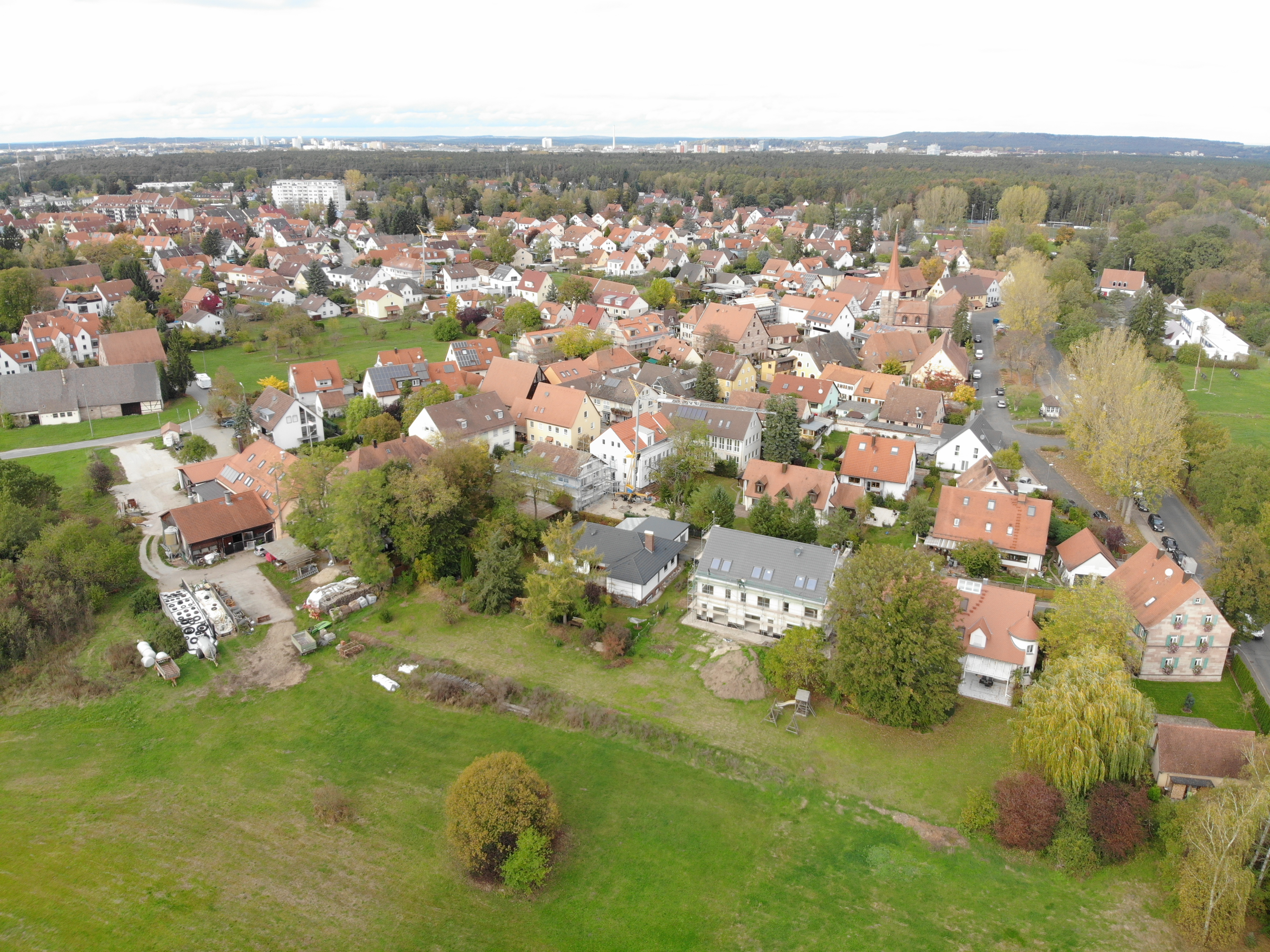
Aerial photo of Tennenlohe

The village is located seven kilometres south of the city of Erlangen at the federal motorway 3 and the federal highway 4, the distance to Nuremberg is ten kilometres. To the north of Tennenlohe, the protected forest area "Brucker Lache" extends to the Erlangen city centre and to the district Bruck. This is also where the Tennenlohe Forest Experience Centre (Walderlebniszentrum Tennenlohe) is located, one of five Forest Experience Centres run by the Bavarian Forest Administration. In addition to a forest museum with exhibitions on the history of the forest called "Sebalder Reichswald" and the flora and fauna of the forest, the Forest Experience Centre also offers an adventure trail with various activities related to the woods such as a forest labyrinth, which can also be used outside the opening hours of the centre. To the east of the village lies the protected forest "Tennenloher Forst", which is not only used by the residents of Tennenlohe as a recreational area for hiking and cycling.

Neighboring places

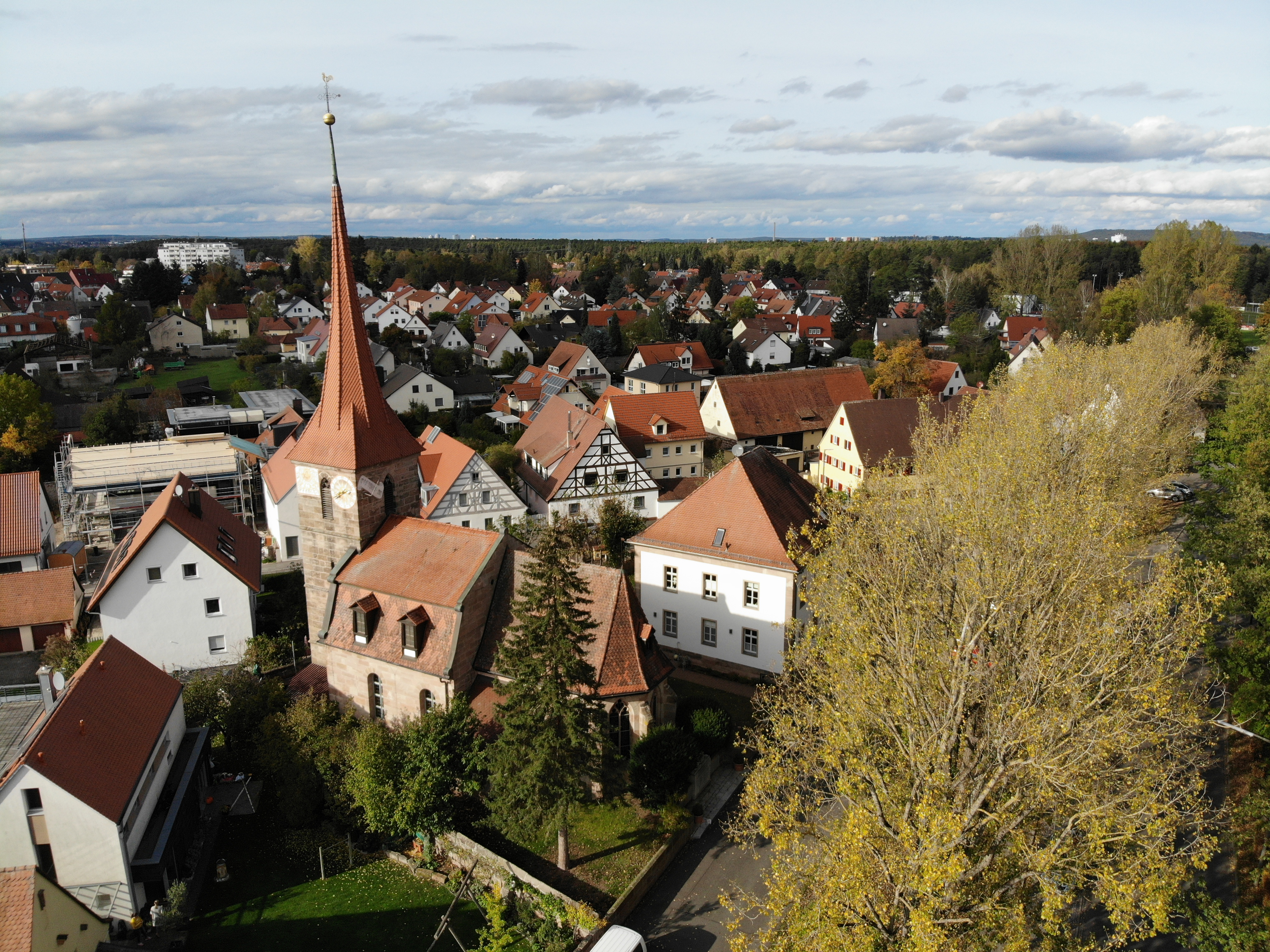
Aerial photo of the Church and the village

Clockwise starting north:

Erlangen, Kalchreuth, Reutles, Großgründlach, Eltersdorf

== History ==
The settlement probably originated at the end of the 12th century and is first documented in 1265. It remained a village with scattered buildings around ten larger farms until the 19th century.

For a long time, Tennenlohe was part of the imperial city of Nuremberg, this can also be seen on the coat of arms of the city of Nuremberg, which hangs in the church of St. Maria Magdalena. Tennenlohe used to be on the Nuremberg-Bayreuth-Leipzig trade route and was therefore a popular place to rest for people passing through.

The medieval church of St. Maria Magdalena was redesigned in baroque style from 1766 to 1768; the nave has a mansard roof. In addition, there are many other half-timbered houses in Tennenlohe that can be seen in the historic town center around the church.

After 1945, numerous new residential and commercial areas were built in Tennenlohe, especially after the completion of the federal motorway 3 from Nuremberg to Frankfurt in 1964. In the 1960s and 1970s, a large number of town houses and apartment buildings were built in Tennenlohe, mainly built by the companies Doma, Heinlein, EBU and the KWG. Today's street “Böhmlach” was called “Doma-Straße” at the time, since only town houses by the company Doma were built there.

On July 1, 1972, Tennenlohe was incorporated into the city of Erlangen. Most of the citizens were against the incorporation. The mayor at the time, Adolf Most, pointed out that the municipality met all requirements and that anincorporation was not necessary. The municipalities of Tennenlohe, Frauenaurach, Kriegenbrunn and some other communities wanted to merge and found one new municipality. This plan however failed and the village was incorporated into the city of Erlangen in 1972. Tennenlohe is now a location of the innovation and start-up centre Nuremberg-Fürth-Erlangen. The Fraunhofer Institute for Integrated Circuits, and more recently, the Geographic Institute of the University of Erlangen are located in Tennenlohe. The corporate headquarters of the large-scale bakery "Der Beck" and a number of companies in the IT sector are also located in Tennenlohe.

Nonetheless, there are still several farms in and around the place.

== Gallery ==
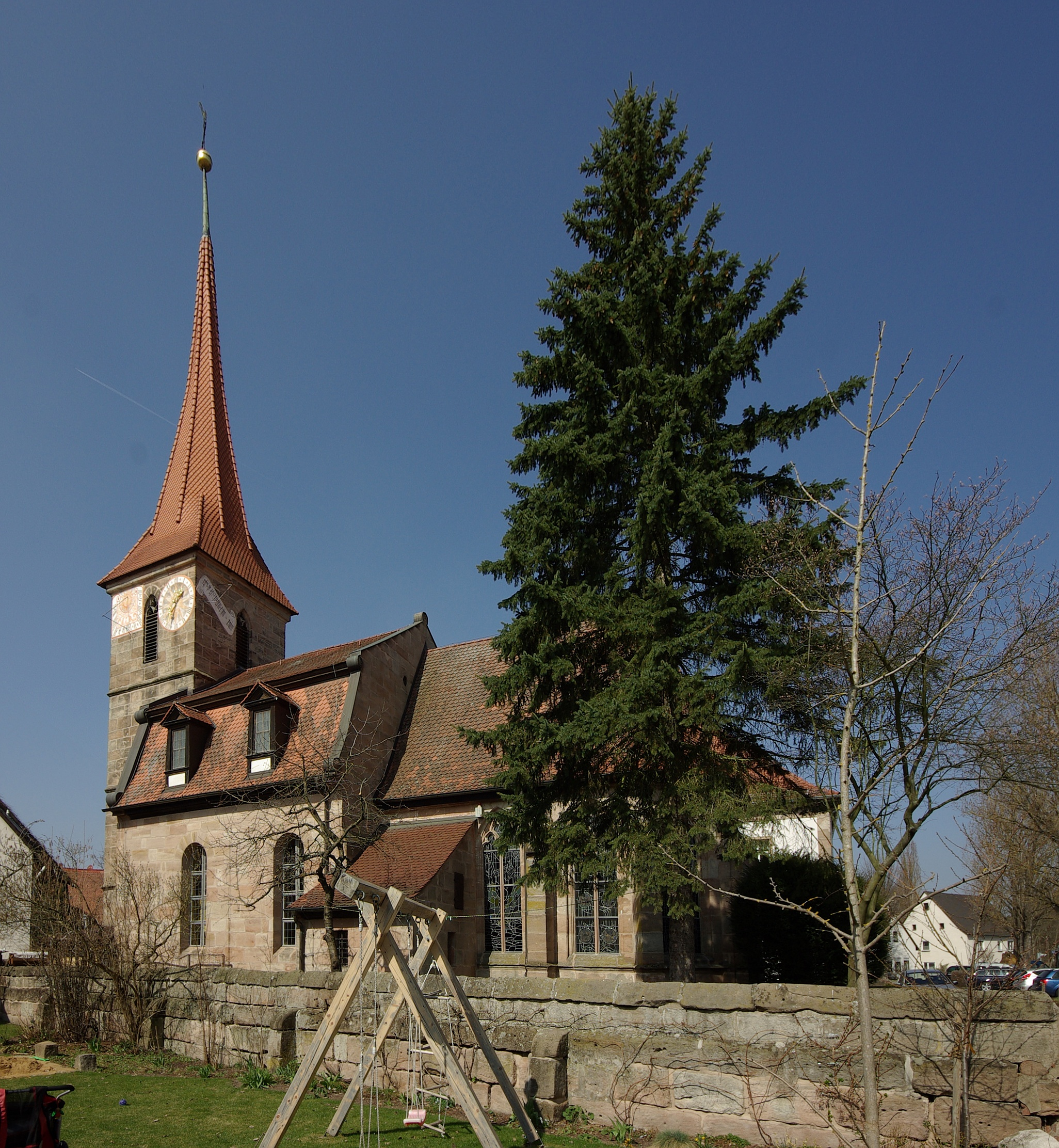
The church St. Maria Magdalena is located in the centre of the district.

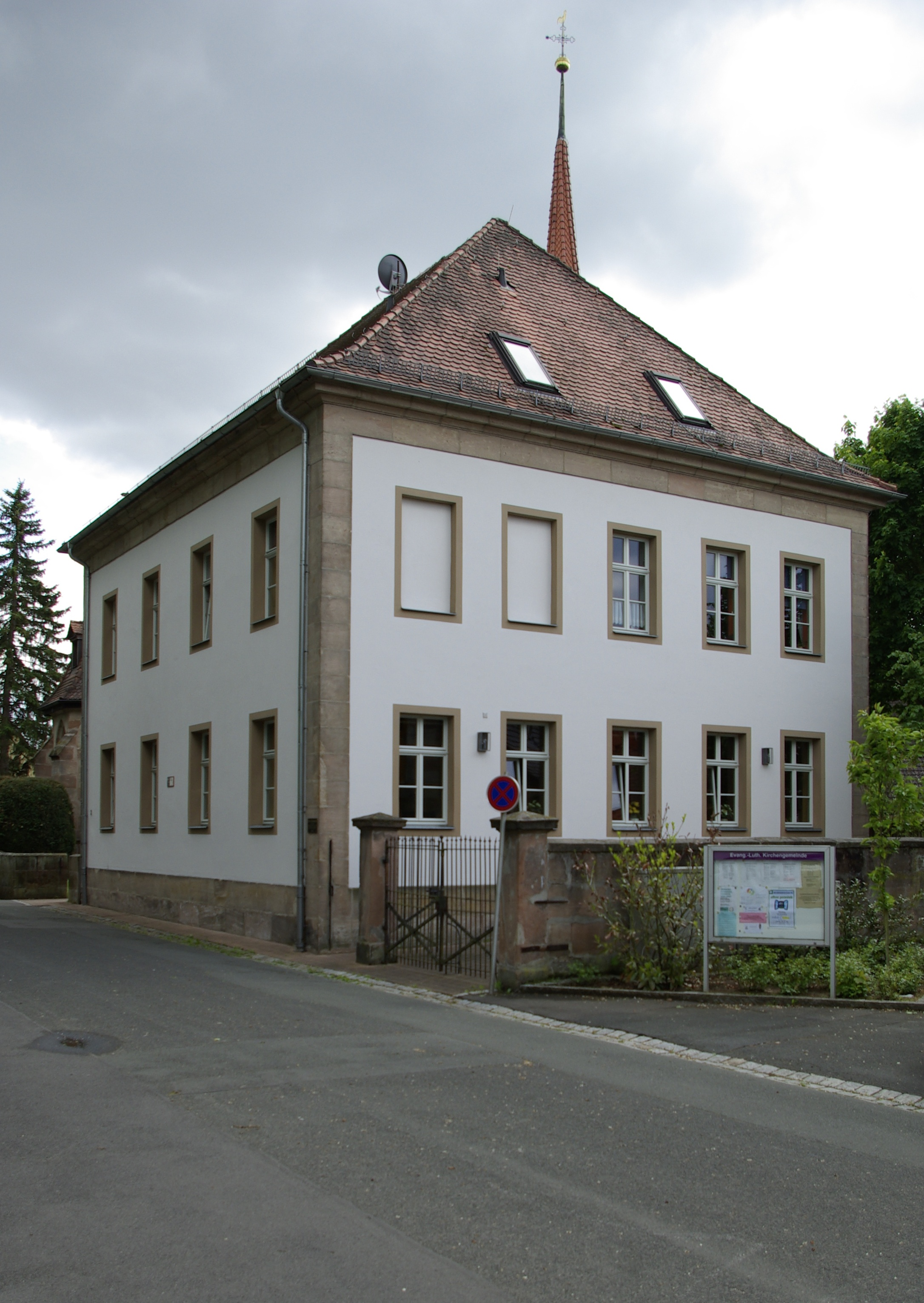
The parish house belonging to the church used to be the primary school in the village.

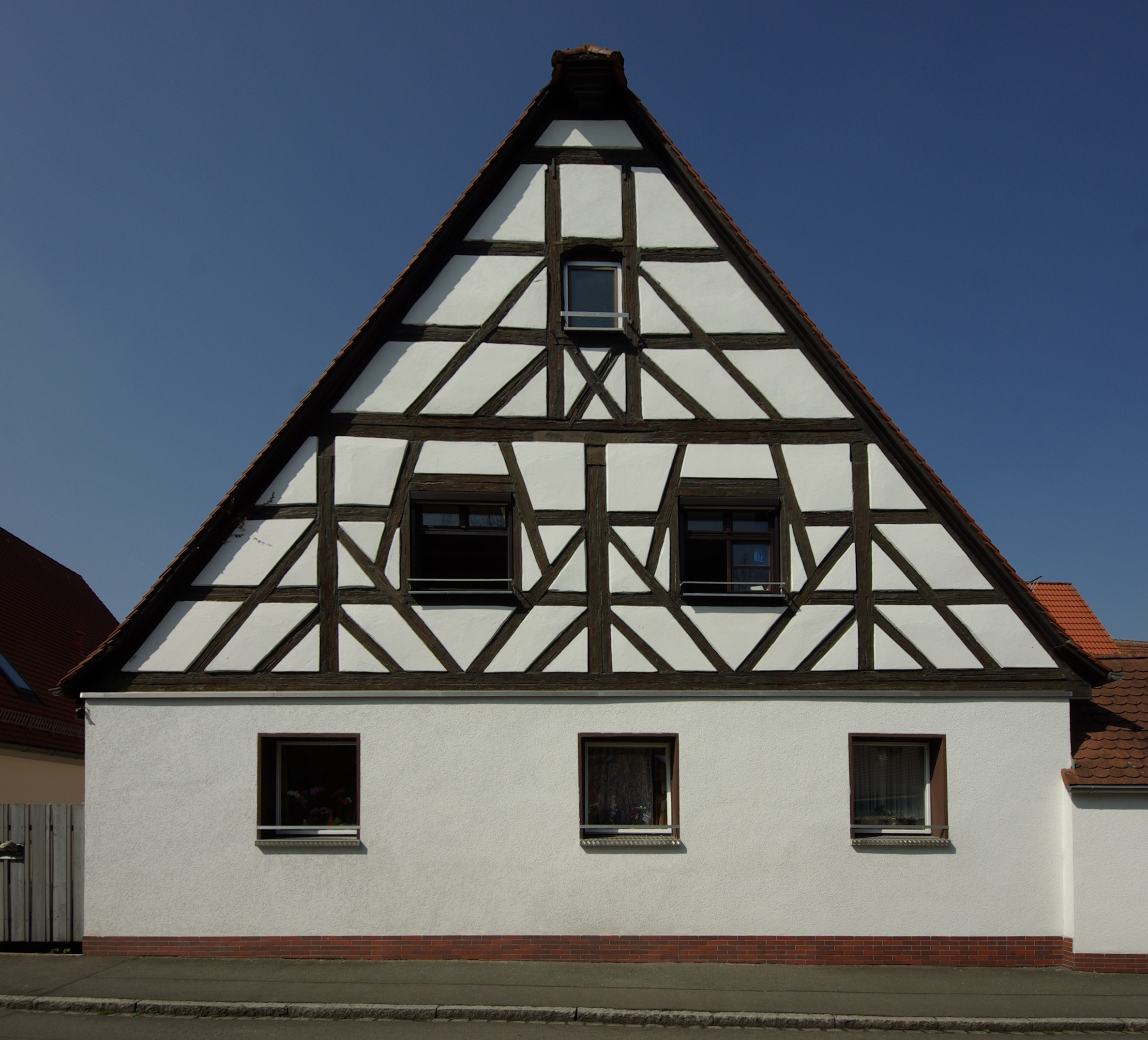
Half-timbered house

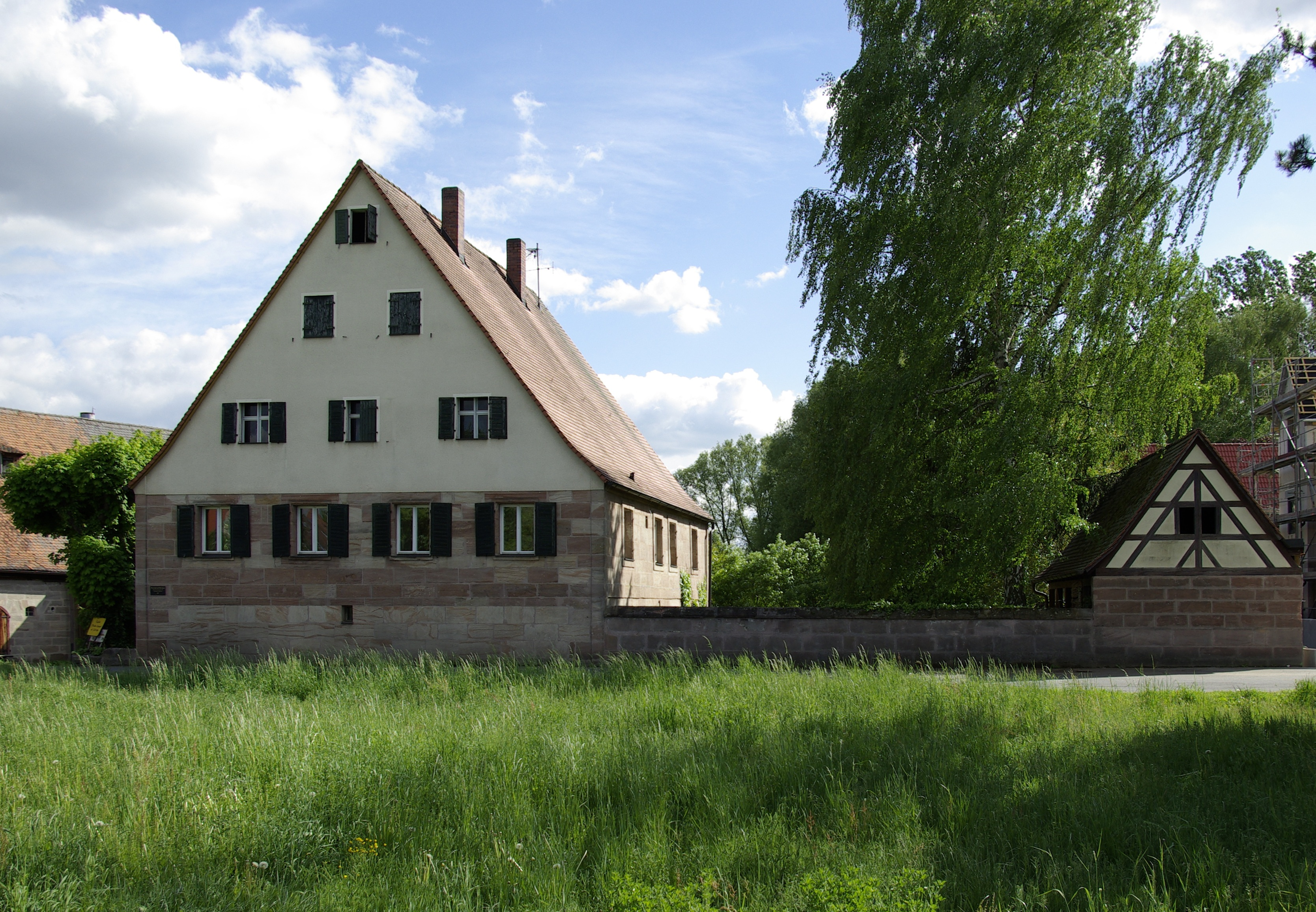
Old traditional farm

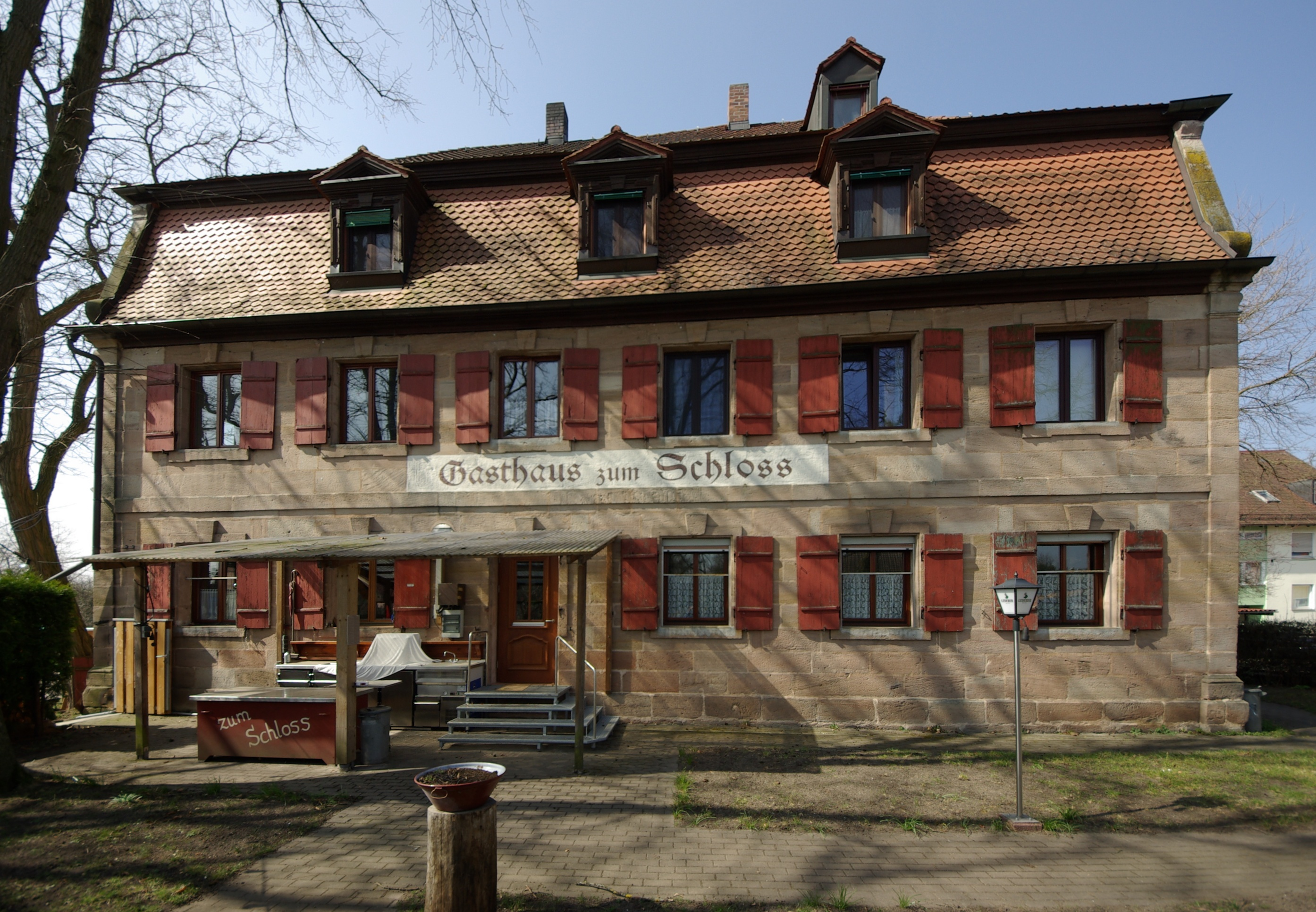
Castle of Tennenlohe

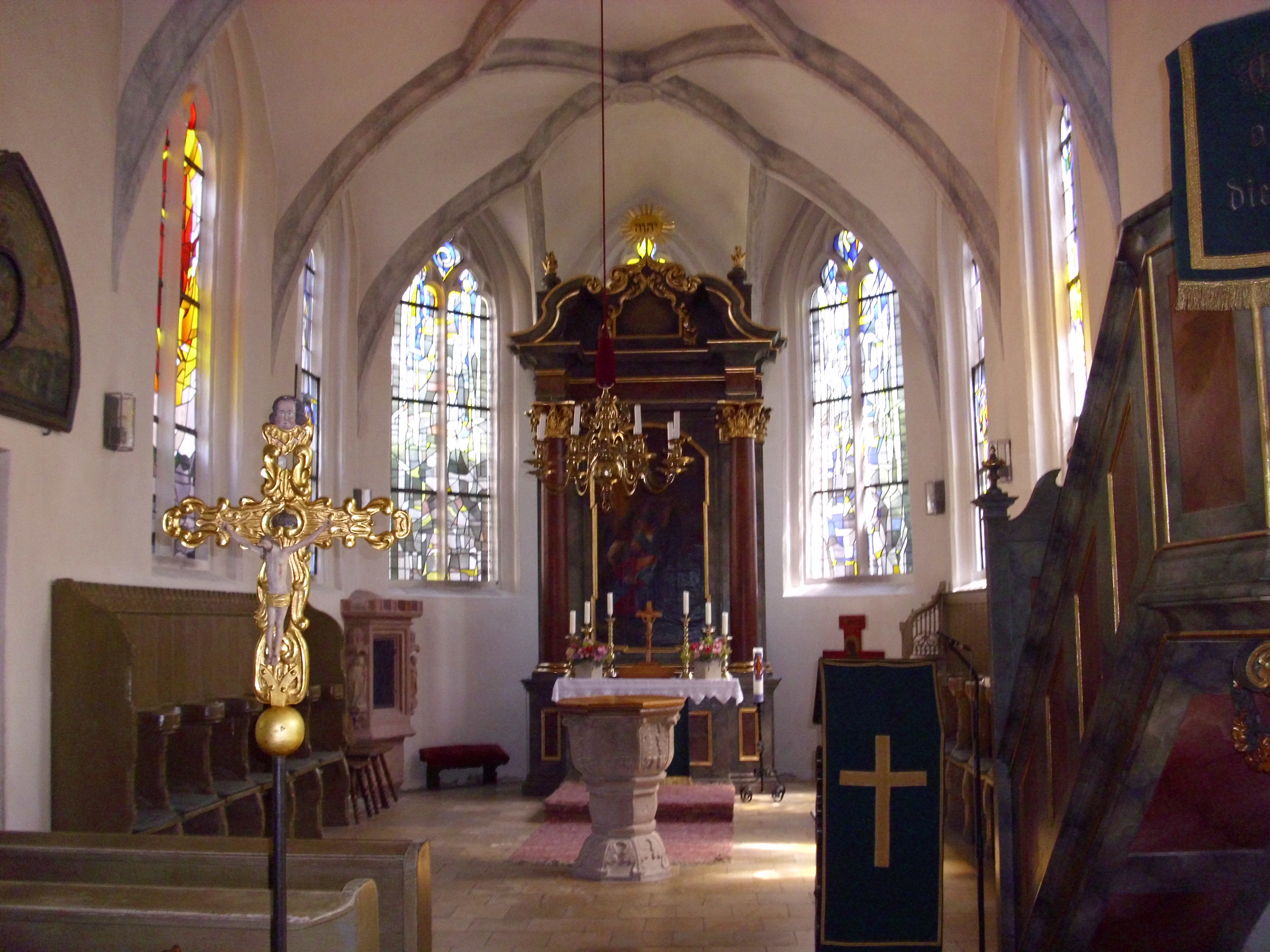
Inside view of the church St. Maria Magdalena

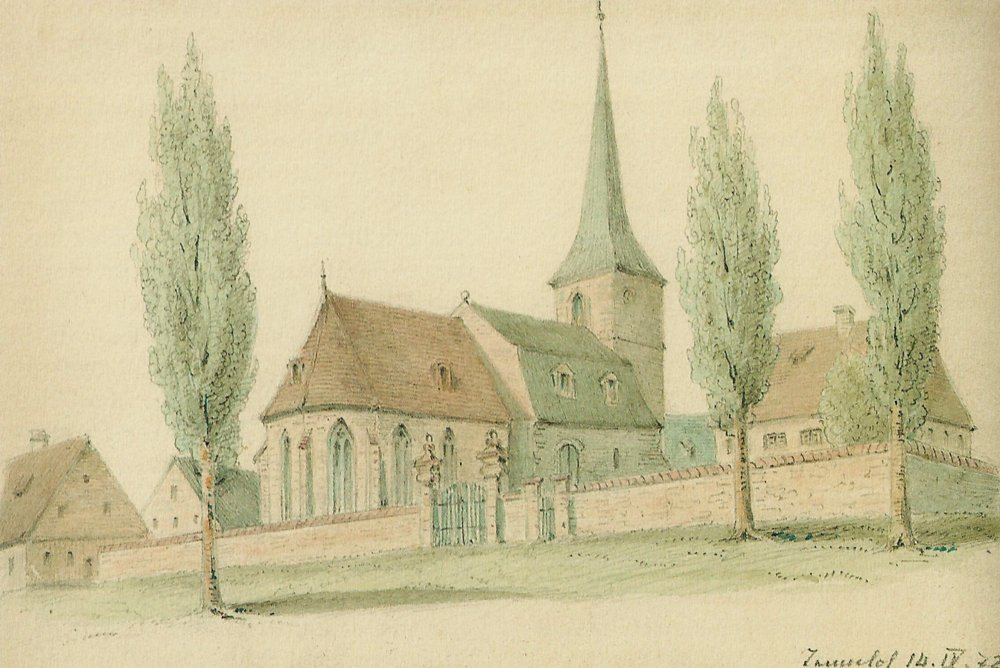
Historic drawing of the church St. Maria Magdalena

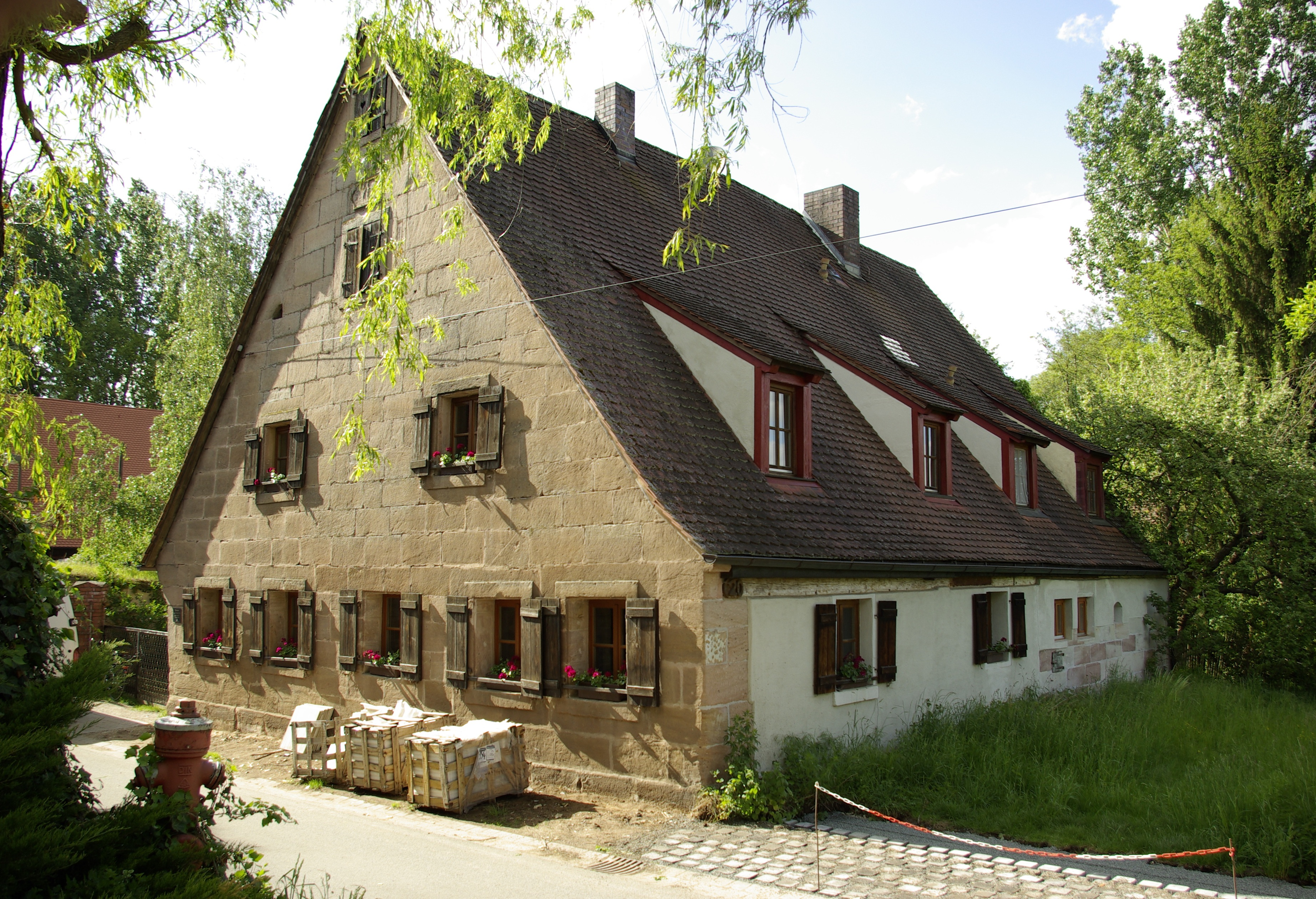
Old farmhouse in the street "Gründlacher Straße"

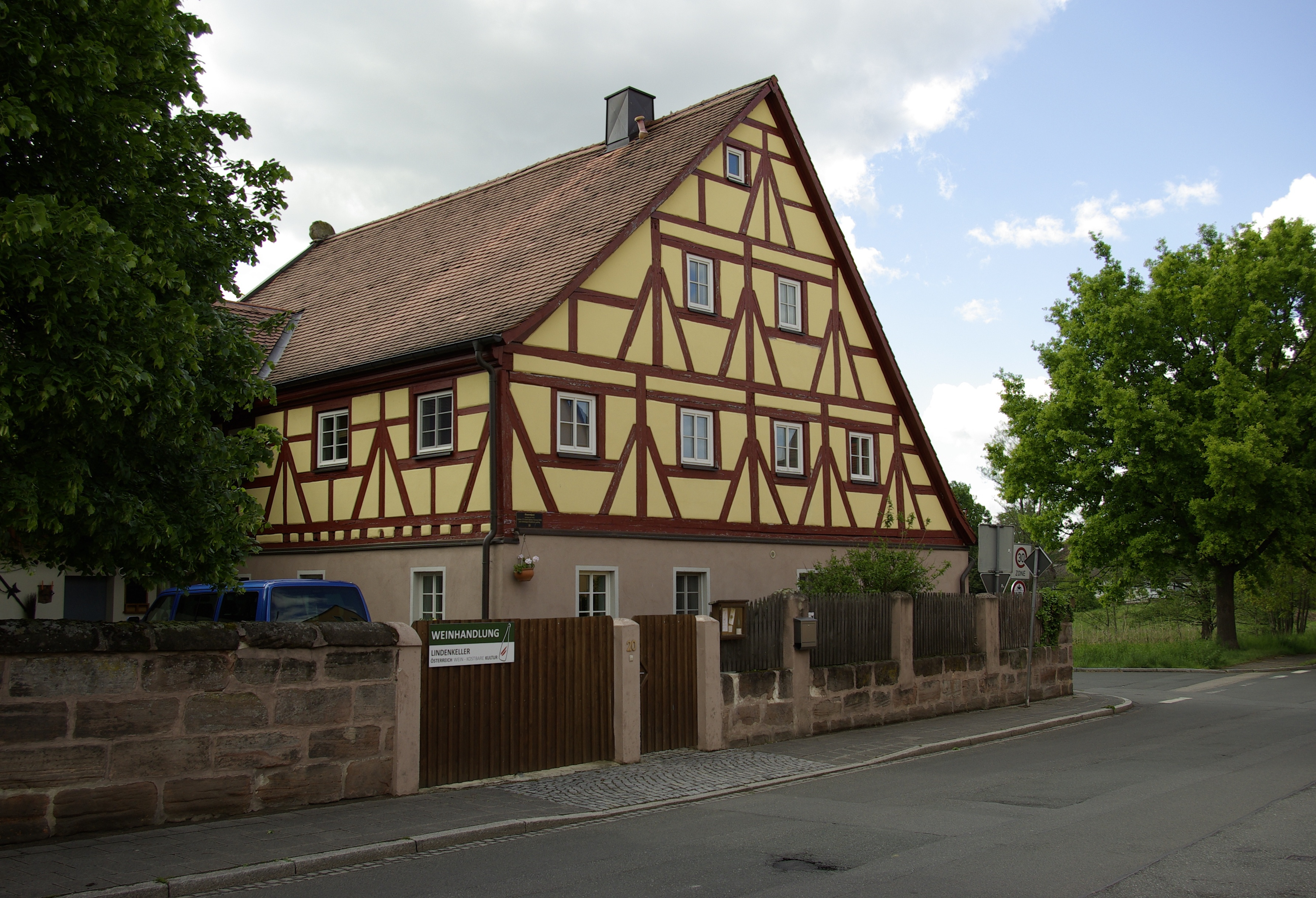
Old half-timbered farmhouse in the street "Sebastianstraße"

== Sources ==
- Dehio: Bayern I: Franken, 2. Aufl., München 1999, S.1015.
- Adolf Most: Tennenlohe: Geschichte und Geschichten 1265-1972. Heimat- und Geschichtsverein Erlangen, Arbeitskreis Tennenlohe, Erlangen 2015
