= Pers Z S =

Signals agency of the German Foreign Office

The Pers Z S was the signals intelligence agency of the German Foreign Office (German: Auswärtiges Amt) before and during World War II. It consisted of two cryptologic sections. Pers Z S was the cryptanalytic section which was called Special Service of Z Branch of the Foreign Office Personnel Department (German: Sonderdienst des Referats Z in der Personalabteilung des Auswärtigen Amtes). Its mission was the solution of foreign diplomatic codes and ciphers. The other section, which was the Cryptography Section was called Personal Z Cipher Service of the Federal Foreign Office (German: Personal Z Chiffrierdienst des Auswärtigen Amtes) (abbr. Pers Z Chi). The latter section was responsible for compilation, distribution and security of Foreign Office codes and ciphers. Both were colloquially known as Pers Z S. Though similar in nature and operation to the OKW/Chi cipher bureau, it was a civilian operation as opposed to the military operation at OKW/Chi and focused primarily on diplomatic communications. According to TICOM interrogators it evinced an extraordinary degree of competence, primarily driven by a consistency of development not found in any other German signals bureau of the period. Pers Z S/Chi was the symbol and the code name of the Chiffrierdienst, i.e. the Cryptanalysis Department of Pers Z S. Although little is known about the organization, in the final analysis, Pers Z S labored at diplomatic cryptanalysis for a regime for which there were no diplomatic solutions.

== Short name ==
The abbreviation of "Chi" for the Chiffrierabteilung is, contrary to what one might expect, not the Greek letter Chi, nor anything to do with the chi test, a common cryptographic test used as part of deciphering an enciphered message, and invented by Solomon Kullback, but only to the first three letters of the word Chiffrierabteilung (English: cipher department).

== History ==
Little was known about Pers Z S before April 1945, when the first section was captured. TICOM (Target Intelligence Committee), the United States effort to capture German intelligence assets after the war, found that captured documents provided little information on the execution of the unit, with the records of the Mathematical and Cryptological section having been destroyed. The field covered by Pers Z S, over 25 countries for a period of 25 years, stymied the TICOM as few interrogators were available, and they also lacked experience in cryptographic diplomatic system. This was the first TICOM investigation. Inevitably there were some areas which were not covered.

In May 1945, the usual approach by the TICOM was to force captured personnel to write "homework" describing processes used in a particular intelligence unit under interrogation, but this method was not fully developed. The only document prepared as "homework" was one dated 6 August 1945 by Professor Dr Hans Rohrbach, along with several of his Pers Z S colleagues, which described the cryptanalysis of the American O-2 strip cypher, which was considered a most significant piece of work.

=== 1919–1937 ===
The original name for Pers Z S was unknown but was likely from Political Intelligence Department, and was placed with Bureau I (Abteilung), the normal administrative department in a German government organization at the time. As the cryptography unit grew, it changed its name to Personnel Bureau It was later called Chiffrierabteilung, later still the Sonderdienst des Referats Z in der Personalabteilung des Auswärtigen Amtes. In 1925, it was known that both the cryptographic and cryptanalysis were unified under a single director.

In 1919 Kurt Selchow had joined the organization and immediately started to professionalize the cipher bureau. He introduced a system of dividing work upon foreign codes and ciphers into sections for various countries and selected as leaders of these sections men such as Dr Pashke, Dr Kunze, Dr Schauffler who he had known during World War I.

The strength of the organization during this period was unknown. In 1945 Dr Paschke and Dr Schauffler stated that between 20 and 30 people were employed in 1918. A May 1919 list shows 63 personnel employed, and would likely cover clerks, administrators, communications and liaison individuals. By 1930 the Pers Z S unit strength was around 50 personnel.

=== 1937–1939 ===
On November 1, 1937, Pers Z S had around 77 employees, and by July 1, 1938, this had decreased to 72 people. It was thought that the cryptanalysis unit had around 20 people. Under interrogation, Paschke and Kunze estimated that in 1939, Pers S Z personnel included between 80 and 100 people. A document captured on December 1, 1939, showed a total strength of 92 people, but another document stated that 45 new appointments were made between September 1, 1939, and November 1939. Thus it would seem reasonable to assume that at the start of the war Pers Z S had a personnel count of 50.

The available documentation from 1937 to 1939 indicate that Z Branch suffered personnel shortages and a certain inertia within management. The job descriptions (German: Begruendungen) attached to the recommendation for promotion documentation detailed that Dr. Kunze was a Specialist (German: Regierungsrat) since 1923 and that Dr Paschke had held the same grade since 1927.

Positions with comparable activities and responsibilities in other ministries are given the grade of Principal Specialist (German: Ministerialrat) or Senior Specialist (German: Oberregierungsrat). This is spite of the fact that the personnel concerned are usually younger and have less time in grade.

Chi complained in 1938 that it could not function efficiently without additional personnel. Ten of its thirteen cryptographers were over fifty years old, six of them over sixty.

Due to the overloading of the cryptographic section, outgoing messages cannot be enciphered and checked with the necessary care. This regrettable state of affair was most noticeable during May 1938 and September 1938, when the political atmosphere was at its tensest.

The cipher bureau was organized as follows:

Group names with director
Location	Unit	Strength	Total
Luisenstift, Managed by Dr Schauffler	Schauffler's Group	8	
	Paschke's Group	13	
	Scherschmidt's Group	10	
	Zastrow's Group	9	
	Karstien's Group	4	
	Hagen's Group	4	
	Records Group	3	
	Clerical Personnel	3	72
Jaegerstrasse 12 III, Managed by Dr Kunze	Special Group Mathematical cryptanalysis	20	20

=== Wartime ===
Little was known about Pers Z at the start of the war.

By October 1, 1940, there were around 290 employees, with Kunze reporting to TICOM that he had 53 people working in his section in January 1941 at the Jaegerstrasse location, and Schauffler reporting that 88 personnel were employed in January 1941, at the Berlin-Dahlem Avenue location. As with other cipher bureaus, similar to the OKW/Chi, the high command bureau and B-Dienst, the Navy cipher bureau, Pers Z S suffered chronic shortage of personnel. On November 26, 1940, Pers Z S submitted a list of problems to high command, primarily due to staff shortages, including 17 major countries which were neglected. Doctor Kunze requested an additional 57 employees, 28 of which would be employees on British and American problems and Dr Schauffler requested an additional 17.

Pers Z S underwent no major changes until November–December 1943 when the unit was split into three groups and partially evacuated from Berlin due to continuous bombing by the Allies. Dr Schauffler and Dr Pasche's unit remained in Berlin at Im Dol 2-6,5. The Linguists unit under Dr Karstien, moved to Hischberg in the Giant Mountains. The mathematicians under Dr Kunze, together with all Hollerith machinery were evacuated to Hermsdorf in Silesia. Towards the end of war, in February and March 1945, the unit further fragmented and with the spectre of the Russian advance the personnel located in the Hirschberg group were moved to Burgscheidungen and joined there by some of the former Berlin personnel in April. The organization was knit together by a daily courier service. Later in February 1945 the mathematics based cryptanalysts subsection fragmented with some personnel moving to Mühlhausen, with the majority of the personnel moving to Zscheppelin, a small village, around 15 km west of Delitzsch. No intercept traffic was received after March 1945, however some cryptanalysis continued in Burgscheidungen on archive material, until it was overrun in April.

It is believed that all the Pers Z S archives, which consisted of around 40 chests, went south from Bavaria to Mühlhausen in mid-April 1945. Individual documents in the chests had no markings on them, but the files and folders were marked Geheime Reichssache, Secret Realm.

== Key personnel ==
=== Administrative Section ===
Minister (German: Gosandtor Ministerdirigigent. Klasse) Kurt Selchow was Director of the Z Branch. He remained head of the cipher bureau until May 1945.

Senior Specialist (Oberregierungsrat) Dr Roy was head of Administrative Section in Z Branch. He had been with Z Branch since the early 1920s. He was taken prisoner at Mühlhausen in April 1945, but was found to be of little importance to TICOM (the United States Target Intelligence Committee).

Senior Specialist Ernst Hoffman had seniority going back to 1919. From 1940, he was head of the Communication Section in Z Branch, a section newly created at the time.

Senior Specialist Dr Horst Hauthal was head of the Cryptographic Section in Z Branch. His rise in Z Branch was considered meteoric by his peers. He joined the Nazi Party in 1937 and was a committed Nazi. A mathematician, economist, and cryptographer, he joined in January 1940 and was promoted to senior specialist before 1945. After the war he became a German ambassador for the Middle East and North Africa. Later, in the 1960s and early 1970s, he led negotiations for the first bilateral investment treaty with Pakistan.

=== Linguistics Cryptanalytic Section ===
Senior Specialist (Oberregierungsrat) Dr Rudolf Schauffler, originally a mathematician, was the nominal head of the Linguistics and Cryptanalysis section from at least November 1, 1937, and was the senior cryptanalyst in the section. He joined Z branch immediately after World War I. His main field of interest was theoretical research (German: Grundlagenforschung) on cryptologic methodology. His language specialties were Japanese and Chinese, which was also the cryptanalytic desk he headed. He also served as the primary advisor to the Foreign Office Cryptographic Section (Pers Z S Chi) on Security

Senior Specialist Dr Adolf Paschke became joint head of the Linguistics and Cryptanalytics section along with Schauffler during the latter half of World War II. He joined the Foreign Office group in 1919, became a Specialist (German: regierungsrat) in 1927 and became a senior specialist (German: Oberregierungsrat) in 1939. In 1941, he was recommended to the rank of Principal Foreign Office Specialist (Vortragender Legationsrat). He was responsible for report publishing and the translators. He was also responsible for liaison with the German armed forces. His language specialties were Italian, Greek and Russian. Dr Adolf Paschke was a Nazi and joined in 1933.

Karl Zastrow was a Technical Assistant (German: Wissenschaftlicher Hilfsarbeiter). A senior member of the Cryptanalytic Section, he entered service in December 1918. Known for being a gifted analyst, he was never promoted due to being absent minded. He headed the American and Scandinavian group which was directed by Dr Hans-Kurt Mueller, with Zastrow as his deputy. He was the unit's expert on American Systems.

Dr Wilhelm Brandes was a Senior Specialist (German: Oberregierungsrat). Dr Brandes headed the group directed by Dr Paschke, which worked to penetrate cyphers of Dutch, Swiss, Belgian or French origin. Having worked with Dr Paschke in World War I, he started working for Pers Z S in 1920. Known for being a capable linguist, archivist and bookbuilder, he had also certain liaison functions for his own group.

Dr Herrmann Scherschmidt was a Senior Specialist (German: Oberregierungsrat). Starting at the Foreign Office in May 1919, he specialized in Slavonic and Near Eastern languages. He headed the Pers Z S Turkish group from 1934 to 1939. Thereafter he took over the Slavonic group until September 1943. Wanting to return to the Turkish group, but unable to do so, he transferred to the translations unit (Foreign Office Document section) until September 1944. He then returned to his old group (Turkish, under Dr Paschke), while Dr Benzing, the then current head of unit, shifted to Arabian and Iranian systems.

Dr Hans-Heidrun Karstien. Dr Karstien joined Pers Z S sometime before 1930. In November 1937, he was an unclassified employee (German: Tarifangestellter) in Group X, then the highest pay grade. He specialized in Japanese and Chinese systems and cyphers, which he worked on from 1930 to 1938. In November 1940, he was listed as a Specialist in Balkan languages, handling Bulgarian, Croatian, Polish, Slovak and possibly Finnish cyphers. He was taken prisoner in April 1945.

Dr Johannes Benzing joined Pers Z S on July 20, 1937. He was the youngest senior official (German: Beamter) in the Pers Z S unit. A linguist, he was a specialist in Near Eastern languages and originally worked under Dr Scherschmidt. He headed this section from October 1939 until September 1944. He was then placed in charge of work for Iranian, Iraqi and Afghan systems.

Dr Ursula Hagen was a Technical Assistant (Grade IV) (German: Wissenschaftliche Hilfsarbeiterin). It was considered difficult for women in Pers Z S to achieve proper recognition or seniority, and Dr Hagen was a case in point. Born March 23, 1901, she entered the unit on October 1, 1922. By 1939 to 1945, she was head of the group, her immediate manager being Dr Paschke. She was responsible for work in England, Ireland, Spain, Portugal and Latin American countries. As manager of the group, she was responsible for 12 staff. Her grade and remuneration were never comparable to similar staff who had the same responsibilities and who were men. She was captured at Zschepplin in 1945 and evacuated to Marburg. Dr Hagen was considered as the best and most successful cryptanalyst in the diplomatic office by Dr Adolf Paschke.

Dr Hans-Kurt Mueller was a Technical Assistant (Grade III), Born on May 1, 1906, he started working in Pers Z S on January 22, 1940. Specializing in American and Scandinavian systems, he was listed as Zastrow's deputy (German: Vertreter) at that time. By April 1945 however, he is listed as head of the group, and Zastrow as his deputy.

Dr Peter Olbricht was a former anthropologist with the Ethnographic Museum (German: Museum für Völkerkunde), located at Prinz Albrecht and Königgrätzer in Berlin and started working for the unit in December 1939. An orientalist of some repute, he specialized in Chinese, Japanese and Manchurian codes, working under the direction of Dr Schauffler. He was in the Hirschberg group from December 1943, and was eventually captured at Burgscheidungen.

Miss Asta Friedrichs. While holding a low rank, she was however, one of the leading personalities of Pers S Z, she joined in September 1940 after studying at the Sorbonne and the America University in Sofia. Working with Dr Karstien, she deputized in the Slavonic Group when needed, while specializing in Bulgarian.

Miss Hildegarde Schrader was a Technical Assistant (Grade IV). Miss Schrader joined Pers Z S in September 1939, and specialized in French codes. In 1943 she was deputy to Dr Brandes in the French-Belgian-Swiss section and took over from Brandes when he fell ill in 1944, in Hirschberg. She was captured at Burgscheidungen.

Dr Otfried Deubner was employed as a Technical Assistant (German: Wissenschaftlicher Hilfsarbeiter) Grade III. Dr Otfried started work with unit on July 7, 1940. By the end of the war, he was assistant to Dr Paschke in the group which handled the Vatican, Italian, Greece and the USSR desks. He was recommended for Specialist in 1941 but decided to stay as a Technical Assistant.

=== Mathematical and Cryptological Section ===
Senior Specialist Dr Werner Kunze was a cryptanalyst and brilliant mathematician with 25 years of Pers Z S experience. A military cryptologist in World War I, he joined the Foreign Office in 1919. Kunze's subsection, the Mathematical-Cryptanalytic subsection, operated apart from the main Pers Z S department (Stammabteilung). His subsection consisted of linguist mathematicians, and he was also responsible for the Pers Z S IBM (Hollerith) machinery. They specialized in difficult systems and complex message encryption, and those problems which required a large outlay of expenditure of both time and personnel, or the applications of technical devices. In December 1939, his group had 20 members.

Prof Dr Hans Rohrbach was a professor of mathematics at the Charles University in Prague. Dr Rohrbach split his duties equally between teaching and cryptanalysis. He started at Pers Z S in early 1940 as a Senior Civil Servant (German: Höherer Beamter). Having an excellent command of the English language, he worked on English, American and Scandinavian as well as on the Japanese desk. Through personality alone, he was one of the leading members of Pers Z S. He was awarded the War Service Cross 2nd Class (German: Kriegsverdienstkreuz II. Klasse) in September 1944 for his work on the solution of the U.S. Diplomatic Strip System O-2.

Dr Helmut Grunsky, a mathematician, started working at Pers Z S in September 1939. Previously he was teaching and conducting research at the Prussian Academy of Sciences. He was Technical Assistant Grade III (Wissenschaftlicher Hilfsarbeiter) in December 1940, and was recommended for promotion to Specialist (Regierungsrat) on March 5, 1941.

Dr Hans-Georg Krug. Little is known of when he joined Pers S Z but it was probable that he joined in early 1940. In 1941 he was recommended for promotion to Specialist. At the end of the war he was in charge of all Pers Z S Hollerith installations and other custom machinery.

Dr Erika Pannwitz. It is not known when Dr Pannwitz joined Pers Z S, but she was head of a group of cryptanalysts in April 1945

Klaus Schultz joined Pers Z S after the start of World War II. A professional mathematician and statistician, he worked for the German Statistical Office (German: Statistisches Reichsamt) before the war. He worked with Dr Kunze's section on December 1, 1939. His last known civil service grade was Technical Assistant Grade III (Wissenschaftlicher Hilfsarbeiter) on March 5, 1941, and he was never promoted during the war

Dr Annelise Hünke started working at Pers S Z on August 31, 1939, as a Technical Assistant Grade III.

Dr Karl Schröter joined Pers Z S in the spring of 1941. A mathematical theoretician at the University of Münster, he received his doctorate under Heinrich Scholz. In 1948 he was professor of mathematics at Humboldt University of Berlin and 1964 became a member of the German Academy of Science. He worked independently on Japanese additive and encipherment systems.

=== Personnel Seconded from OKW/Chi ===
Arthur Grosse, who specialized in Chinese and Japanese codes, Edgar Hierer, a minor cryptanalyst, who also worked on Japanese and Chinese codes and Cort Rave, or Kurt Rave, also specializing in Japanese, Chinese code, were members of OKW/Chi and were seconded to Pers Z S in December 1943 after OKW/Chi was bombed out of their building, the Bendlerblock, located in Tirpltzufer section in Berlin. Working on the Chinese and Japanese desk, Dr Hans Rohrbach commented:

...definitely lower grade personnel and had come here to be trained

Professor Dr Cort Rove stated in letter with Dr Otto Leiberich and Jürgen Rohwer that his team of linguists and cryptanalysts, solved on a daily basis, the Japanese PURPLE diplomatic cipher

== Operations ==
=== Intercept Network ===
Pers Z S had a single intercept station, called the Landhaus in Dahlem, that was used to cover priority communications, e.g. between Berlin and Ankara or Berlin to Lisbon, however for message intercepts Pers Z S received the bulk from OKW/Chi, Hermann Göring's Research Office of the Reich Air Ministry (FA) and the German Post Office (German: Reichspost). Traffic intercepts sources were generally unknown as the traffic intercept had undergone post-processing before arriving at Pers Z S. When the FA was bombed out, the traffic was received direct from the Reichspost.

=== Operational Environment ===
The linguist Dr Karstien, stated under interrogation that as a signal intelligence organization, the cryptanalysts within it received little official recognition from senior officials in the Foreign Ministry, the Auswärtiges Amt, even though they were quick to complain. Dr Karstien stated that Kurt Selchow might learn from Joachim von Ribbentrop, that the foreign minister was interested in a specific area, perhaps the Balkans but seldom was more specific guidance offered concerning the needs of senior officials. Dr Karstien stated: We worked, entirely in the dark (German: Wir arbeiteten vollständig im Dunkeln). Reaction from senior personnel at the foreign office was rare. Miss Friedrichs stated:

From time to time copies of messages issued had been returned bearing a stamp indicating they had been seen by the Führer. Otherwise, no indication of the importance attached to their work had ever penetrated to the level at which she worked.

Occasionally a staff member would receive praise. In a letter dated 30 May 1938, Dr Paschke received a letter of commendation from Undersecretary Ernst von Weizsäcker, congratulating Paschke on a particularly successful effort (German: besonders erfolgreiche Bemühungen) in the Italian work assigned him. Hans Rohrbach was also awarded the War Merit Cross. As the cryptanalysts received neither acknowledgement nor recognition from above, consequently they worked in an administrative vacuum.

==== Attitude of Pers Z S leaders ====
Some responsibility for the failure to disseminate information internally, concerning successes, must be assigned to the Pers Z S leaders. Kurt Selchow, characterized as a competent administrator who knew little about cryptography. Selchow was preoccupied with the bureaucratic intrigues of the ministry and left the substantive work to Paschke, Schauffler and Kunze, who ran their subsections affairs as they saw fit. Paschke and Hagen both stated that they knew more about message content than did junior personnel. Miss Friedrich stated that there was little encouragement given to the communication of results inside the organization of junior members, who were encouraged to mind their own business. In the linguistic section, desk chiefs were left to their own devices. They decided priorities and deployed staff accordingly. It seems that Pers Z S personnel were not intelligence minded. They were cryptanalysts and they thought primarily in terms of cryptanalysis, and intelligence was to them a by-product of their work.

==== Handling and Processing of Decodes ====
As described above, instruction from Ribbentrop was invariably of a general nature, and solely concerned with the subject matter of intelligence, e.g. Poland or the invasion, and had no concern for the details of the systems. Kurt Selchow dealt with Ribbentrop directly, and did not go through Schröder or Ernst von Weizsäcker, who was the principal assistant to Ribbentrop. To further confuse the chain of command, Miss Ursula Hagen stated in interrogation that she received her instructions direct from "Secretary", Undersecretary Gustav Adolf Steengracht von Moyland. Pers Z S had no evaluation unit with each desk chief deciding which of his or her groups decrypts would be circulated (without comment or interpretation) to higher authorities. Since Pers Z S suffered from chronic staff shortages, it forced the chiefs to lend a hand with practical cryptanalysis as well as translation, leaving scant time for the selection process. According to Dr Paschke, Ribbentrop read only about 20-30% of the material produced. His secretaries, Weber and Karl_Christian von Loesch, selected these for him. Ribbentrop saw between one and four items a day, or less. His principal assistant Gustav Adolf Steengracht von Moyland, or one of the secretaries, determined what distributions should be made outside the Ministry. If all these statements are to be taken at face value then at least five people were involved in determining the distribution of decodes, with the consequent disadvantages of divided responsibility and possible loss of continuity. The military historian, David Alvarez stated:

Occasionally, Ribbentrop would forward a decrypt to the Führer's HQ for Hitlers attention, but in the highly competitive world of wartime German intelligence, where knowledge and control of resources was power, there was little incentive to circulate the product to a wider audience and it is unlikely that Ribbentrop shared his decrypts with other departments.

It was unknown how the Pers Z S intelligence was integrated into the total intelligence picture. All top officials interrogated at the Nuremberg trials agreed there was no central clearing house for intelligence at the top. Wilhelm Keitel did not know whether or not he received all the Pers Z S decodes. Alfred Jodl knew in a general way of the Foreign Office achievements, but did not receive the Pers Z S output. Where a messages solved by the OKW/Chi was not also in the hands of the Foreign Office, then a copy of the decrypt in the form of a Reliable Report (German: Verlässliche Nachrichten) (abbr. VN) was passed to them. Keitel in an enlightening quote, stated of Pers Z S, during the Nuremberg trials, that they were:

extremely secretive and jealous about anything their bureau produced. If, by any chance, Keitel produced direct to Hitler an OKW/Chi diplomatic decode and did not pass it via the Foreign Office, they became extremely annoyed. Actually, this happened very rarely.

No mention is made of decoded exchanged between agencies for technical purposes, and decodes exchanged with agency heads to be used for intelligence purpose.

=== Collegiate atmosphere ===
The working environment in Pers Z S was closer to a university faculty than an intelligence agency. There was little sense of urgency. Desk chiefs, who took pride in the linguistic abilities of their staff and set high standards for translation, might hold a decrypt until every nuance of meaning and intention has been uncovered. Crypt-analytical problems were considered intellectual exercises rather than potential sources of intelligence. Lacking guidance and feedback from the final end user of their product, the code-breakers came to consider cryptanalysis as an end in itself rather than an instrument for the production of intelligence.

== Cryptographical achievements ==
=== Organization ===
Per Z S grew organically before World War II and as with any small organization it grew more along with personnel factors than any logical plan. Although Dr Schauffler was the unit's leader during the interwar period, Dr Paschke, a more successful cryptanalyst, forceful personality and a Nazi, assumed more of a leadership role. However, TICOM interrogations could find no definitive documentation to assert who led the unit in 1945. It was possible there was none, but it seems probable that Dr Paschke in deference to Dr Schauffler's seniority, no actual administrative changes had occurred. Dr Kunze was the leading mathematical cryptanalyst.

=== Mathematical and linguistic cryptanalysis ===
There was very little in terms of organization in Pers Z S, in April 1945, when World War II was coming to an end. Working conditions meant that all elements of the unit were working in the same general area, since the evacuation of Berlin in November 1943. However, one cardinal organization rule was followed: the rule was that mathematical cryptanalysis involving the initial solution of extremely difficult systems, the solutions of complex encipherments and additives and the application of machine systems and techniques to these problems should be kept separate from linguistic cryptanalysis. This was defined as current solutions of known additive and enciphering systems, code-book reconstruction, translation and publication.

Dr Schauffler's responsibilities were theoretical research of cryptanalytic methods and systems, publications and consultation with the Cryptographic Section (Pers Z Chi) on the security of own systems and processes at the Foreign Office. As a linguist he headed the group whose specialties were Japanese and Chinese, under Dr Paschke.

=== Linguistic cryptanalysis subsection ===
This subsection that was managed by Dr Paschke consisted of a number of small linguistic groups, organized along semi-linguistic or semi-geographical lines. Organization appeared to be fluid, varying according to metrics like intelligence and cryptanalytic priorities. It was organized into the following groups.

Linguistic area coverage by director
Linguistic Area	Group Head
Japan, China, Manchukuo	Dr Schauffler
America	Dr Zastrow
France, Belgium, Switzerland and the Netherlands	Dr Brandes
Italy, Greece, Vatican, Soviet Union	Dr Paschke
Turkey	Dr Scherschmidt
Iran, Afghanistan, Middle East	Dr Benzing
Romania	Dr Kasper
England, and British Empire, Spain, Portugal, Latin America	Dr Hagen
Bulgaria, Croatia, Poland, Yugoslavia and Baltic States	Dr Karstein

Personal considerations seemed to have played a part in the organization of the subsection.

=== Mathematical cryptanalysis subsection ===
Dr Kunze was responsible for this subsection, which was never precisely defined. It is believed it had a loose internal organization which enabled personnel to focus full concentration on the most important problems as they arose It was assumed by TICOM from a document captured on January 18, 1941, that the subsection had six groups: England, America, Japanese Diplomatic, Japanese Military, Greece and a study of German systems and their own procedures (German:eigene Verfahren).

==== Machinery ====
The section had its own IBM Hollerith machinery since 1942. The tabulating machinery was used in solving the solution of difficult additives and superencipherment (double encryption or Multiple encryption). At the end of the World War II, the machinery installation had:

- 20 alphabetic punches (German: alphabetische Locher) (Punched tape)
- 10 sorters machines (German: Sortiermaschinen)
- 2 collators (German: Kartenmischer) (Collation)
- 2 reproducers (German: Kartendoppler)
- 1 number punchers (German: Rechenlocher)
- 4 alphabetic tabulators (German: Alphabetishe Tabelliermaschinen) (Tabulating machine)
- 2 calculating tabulators (German: Tabelliermaschinen D 11)

A number of accessories had been designed for these machines. For the sorting machines, two devices, the card counter (German: Kartenzähler) and the number finder (German: :Nummernsucher). The alphabetical tabulators had an attachment which had prevented the machine from printing unless there were two or more identical cards, which was useful for finding repeats. The D 11 was possibly a Hollerith machine made by a German Firm

The most useful special device was the so-called automaton, a rapid deciphering machine developed for use on the American Diplomatic Strip Cypher Another machine developed, a type of comparator (German: Spezialvergleicher), to solve Japanese transposition ciphers by dragging the end of the message through the cipher text.

=== Cryptanalysis successes ===
Considering the small staff that Pers Z S had, the conclusion must be drawn that Pers Z S cypher cryptanalysis skills were considerable. Diplomatic intercepts of 50 countries were monitored, and only three used diplomatic systems which completely defied successful analysis; these were Russia, Czechoslovakia and Poland after 1942-1943.

==== Cryptanalysis successes by country ====
Detailed listing of Cryptanalytic Successes by individual Countries. Pers Z S never worked on any commercial cyphers or codes like the Bank of England code.

Successes By Country
Country Name	Notes on compromised Cyphers
Argentina	At least three main codes were known, one of which, a 5-digit, one part 110,000 group system, that was usually enciphered by the addition or subtraction of a constant. It was read almost without gaps, with 240 intercepts decoded in 1942.
Belgium	The Pers Z S cryptanalysts were familiar in 1945 with three readable Belgian Codes. The main systems were four-digit; one-part or partially alphabetic codes containing approximately, 10,000 groups. They were usually enciphered with a daily changing unsystematic bigram substitution table. A total of 373 messages were published in 1942, a small proportion of the total intercepted and broken
Brazil	Prior to 1943, 1nsofar as limitations or traffic depth and personnel permitted, the Pers Z S cryptanalysts seem to have read nearly all major Brazilian diplomatic codes. Three systems in particular seem to have been read almost without gaps. A five-figure, one-part, 165,000 group code (called Bras. Bl by the Germans) a five-letter~ partially alphabetic, 82,000 group code (called Bras. B2); and a five-figure, one-part, 100000 group system (called Bras. Z 1). The basic book for Bras. B2 1f was available in Mimeograph form. Traffic totals fell off sharply after the rupture or diplomatic relations in January 1942, and it was not indicated whether the earlier successes were continued.
Bulgaria	Before 1938, Bulgarian systems were not considered important at all, with only sporadic efforts being undertaken. Bulgaria used two basic five-digit 35000 to 40000 group code books. Both were one-part codes, repaginated for various links, usually used enciphered. Hermann Göring's Forschungsamt had provided photocopies of the two books Senior Specialist (German:Oberregierungsrat) Scherschmidt started work on the codes in Summer 1941, and that from 1943, all major Bulgarian codes were read.
Chile	Pers Z S possessed photostat copies of the Chilean SOLAR Code. Hagen stated that the SOLAR Code consisted of alphabetical groups of three letters (indicating, inter alia, tenses) and four letters (always ending with Y and Z), each in alphabetical order. There were tables of two letter groups, giving frequent short words, articles and particles, and single-letter groups for the numbers and months. Clear words were indicated by the 2 letter group DY. Little information is available on successes with Chilean systems after 1942. The on-part 2/3/4 digit 42,000 group code was known as Clave Solar (Chilean Name) and was read at least until late 1942, and possibly until the end of the war.
China	There is little direct information regarding Pers Z S successes with Chinese systems. The Chinese four-letter and four-figure codes were apparently read until 1930. Few details are available for work done from 1930 to 1938. At that point work was stopped, only to be taken up in 1941. TICOM interrogations showed that two three-letter codes, one military and the other one an Attaché system, were solved, which had ceased in April or May 1943. The first groups of the traffic were EFR, SKW and JKW. The groups were three letter groups. They solved the recypherment but never read any messages. Another three-letter system called uti was read in 1941-1942. Documents, on the other hand, suggest a greater success, although it could not be verified by TICOM.
Czechoslovakia	Pers Z S did not work on Czechoslovakia diplomatic systems. According to Dr Karstien, the systems used were One-time pads and therefore unbreakable. TICOM appreciated knowing the fact that Czechoslovakia used one-time pads.
Ireland	Substantial work was done to break the Irish diplomatic links to Berlin. The Irish used the British Government Telegraph Code (abbr GTC) which was called B-22 by Pers S Z, which was enciphered by the use of substitution alphabets. This code, a five-letter, one-part, 84,000 code group system, had been among the cache of documents which had been captured at Bergen during 1940. No messages of consequence was reported on this code. Dr Hagen, reported another code that was described as having 24 hatted alphabets, with each group being taken from one alphabet. The alphabets were not used in order but always systematically. The last group of a telegram indicated the system to be used in the next message, e.g. if the last group was recyphered with alphabet 5, then this alphabet would also be used for the first group of the next message. The tables changed only four times during the war. Different keys were used for various posts, e.g. Bern, Rome, Berlin, Paris, Madrid. The traffic became more difficult to read in 1942/1943 when there was insufficient material to read and not enough staff. Then the Forschungsamt (abbr. FA) started work on it and solved the Berlin and Madrid links. Pers Z S took over the keys from the FA in 1944. The first three figures of the message gave the page number, the fourth figure the number of the block, the fifth and sixth the line numbers. This new system used a 300-figure subtractor; each end of the link was allotted 25 such keys. If the length of the message exceeded 300 figures, the key was repeated. Message consisted of reports of the Irish minister on the static affairs of Germany. The Staatssekretär (Secretary of State) was interested in the messages, as was Joachim von Ribbentrop and Hitler. Six long messages and less than a week were enough to break a new substitution table.
France	Success against French diplomatic cyphers and codes was considerable. Dr Brandes stated in his 1941 report, that approximately 75% of French diplomatic codes were being read. Most diplomatic transmissions were four-figure, two-part codes, enciphered either through an additive system, or by bigram substitution tables. Many were compromised in 1940, and later, when they were deposited with the German Armistice Commission at Wiesbaden.
Greece	According to Dr Deubner, there were three main Greek diplomatic systems, all of which were being read: An unenciphered five-letter code book, where the fifth letter was for inflection only, which carried most of the traffic; an enciphered four-letter book, used mainly for traffic with Bern; and a four-letter figure book, used with 30 bigram substitution tables of 100 bigrams each, used for traffic on the Moscow, Washington, D.C., Cairo and Ankara links.
Netherlands	Little information is available regarding Pers Z S work on Dutch systems. A 1939 report listed work on a four-letter, one-part code, and a figure code convertible to a letter basic code
Hungary	It was not known whether the unit worked on Hungarian codes. In April 1940, Dr Paschke reported that he had discussed cooperation on Hungarian systems with Wilhelm Fenner and Seifert of OKW/Chi. Fenner recommended that Pers Z S attack the five-figure code designed as U-3
Iran	Dr Benzing stated that all the Iranian systems were read. The Iranians used three-letter, 12,000-13,000 group, one part or reversed-alphabetic, enciphered code books.
Italy	Work on Italian diplomatic codes was an outstanding Pers Z S achievement. From 1935 until late 1942, with lapses as new code books were introduced, Pers Z S read all Italian diplomatic codes. The 1940 reports from the Italian Group listed twelve codes, enciphered or unenciphered, all of which were read. The work increased in difficulty in 1942-43, when Italy introduced bigram substitution over additive on the basic code books. Dr Paschke stated: If the basic books had been changed, the traffic would have been impossible to read Some system were read after the collapse in 1943. Mention was made of a Badoglio double transposition system which was never solved. Dr Paschke mentioned three Neo-Fascist systems which were read in the latter stages of the war The Neofascists had used a 5000 figure subtractor, with a peculiar arrangement of the figures in the subtractor that assisted in the solution. During the last three months of the war, the Neofascists used unencyphered books which were easily read, and an alphabetical book with a short subtractor called RA 1.
Japan	Pers Z S read the lower grade Japanese systems until 1934. After 1934, the Japanese went over increasingly to the use of a machine, JB-48, or Type A Cipher Machine, which was code named the Red Cipher Machine by the US. This machine was solved in September 1938 and read currently until February 1939, when the traffic became unreadable. Per Z S had failed to realize that Type B Cipher Machine, code named Purple by the US. A major diplomatic codes, known to Pers Z S as JB-57 was solved at the end of 1941 and read currently for about two years. This was a two-four letter book, enciphered by a series of alphabets and/or stencil transpositions with nulls. Some success was also achieved with other diplomatic systems, specifically JB-64, which was code named JBA by the USA. It was a two/three letter code.
Yugoslavia	Some work was done in 1940-1941 of which little is known. The Yugoslavs used a five-figure codes with letter bigram tables consisting of 100 bigrams. This system was read from 1938 to 1943, when traffic dropped, after which it was read with interruptions. They had not received any Marshall Tito traffic, nor Military attaché traffic intercepts.
Manchuria	Manchukuoan systems were handled by the group which worked on Japanese and Chinese systems. Little data is available. A three-letter, Japanese language code book, enciphered with a 15-place transposition was read.
Mexico	No information is available as to the successes with Mexican systems after 1942. The cyphers were as follows, Pomos was a one-part, five-letter code and a Xepit, a similar system, both enciphered by substitution alphabets. These were read through to 1942. The Xepit book was compromised in November, 1942, although it had been broken prior to compromise.
Poland	Little progress was made after 1942. Dr Karstien stated that Polish codes: Were unbreakable in practice- there was too many of them, [and] they required too much work The principal Polish diplomatic code, classified as PD-1 by Pers Z S, was an enciphered four-figure, two-part code, that was broken in 1940, and read 100% until October 1942, when it went out of use.
Portugal	A five-figure, partially alphabetic, 50,000 group book, which was code named 302 by Pers Z S was read in 1941, with some success. Two other five-figure, partially alphabetic, 61,500 group books were compromised in December 1942 when a basic book, called 205 was received from the OKW/Chi. After that time, the traffic was read 100%. The work done in the 1942-1945 period does not seem to have been covered in the interrogations.
Romania	Little was known about Romanian cyphers. Dr Kasper and Dr Menning, the head and deputy head of the Romanian group, respectively, were never captured. A single page reports, signed by Dr Kasper in 1940, listed seven known diplomatic systems, code-named "R11-R17" by Pers Z S, which were all five-figure codes, varying from 70,000 to 100,000 groups and re-enciphered by means of the ten-place substitution tables. Captured code books reconstructions indicate an approximate 5% to 10% recovery on book groups.
Soviet Union	Work on Russian diplomatic systems was not considered a Pers Z S commitment. Dr. Kunze in interrogations made it clear that Russian systems had been read up until 1927, but that no success had been achieved after that time. Soon after the disclosure of deciphered telegrams during the ARCOS affair, Soviet diplomats adopted a very secure one-time pad system. Colonel Mettig of OKW/Chi stated: [that] after a certain date, [which he could not remember], no Russian diplomatic traffic intercepts were attempted, either by his agency, or Pers Z S.
Scandinavia	Dr Mueller, who was the head of the Scandinavian desk, stated that he had worked on Scandinavian systems for about three months in 1941. After that, all work was transferred to OKW/Chi. During that time he worked on the Swedish unrecyphered five-figure hat book. No work was done on Danish or Norwegian codes. Dr Rohrbach stated that he had investigated traffic thought to be Swedish Hagelin for three months in 1941 and again in August, 1944. Each worked in different sections of Pers Z S, so there is no contradiction in the statement.
South Africa	As United Kingdom.
Spain	Little work was done on Spanish systems. In 1941, the only years for which reports are available, work was done only on 04 (German name), a 4-figure, partly alphabetic 10,000 group code book. The book was partially recovered.
Switzerland	All Swiss diplomatic systems were read, except the Enigma cipher machine, except for a time in 1941. The cyphers were three letter books, usually bilingual, enciphered with substitution tables. New wiring on the Enigma was solved by cribs every three months. Subsequent messages were recovered from message texts.
Thailand	According to the reports of 1941 and 1942 issued by Miss Hagen's group, the main Thailand Code was a one-part, five-figure 110,000 group English language code, used both enciphered and enciphered. It was read almost without gaps.
Turkey	Pers Z S started work on Turkish systems after the 1934 Montreux Fascist conference. Most Turkish diplomatic traffic was read. Three codes were usually in use, changing at monthly intervals. In 1944-1945, the codes were chiefly one-part, with a cyclic additive, and were readily broken. A 40-figure subtractor was used.
United Kingdom including British Empire	The Pers Z S principal successes were on medium grade letter codes. The Government Telegraph Code, called B22@ by Pers Z S, used by communication with Canada, Australia, Eire was read. Code B23 used for South African communications was read. These were five-letter, one-part, 84,000 group codes, usually unenciphered. When Norway surrendered in early May 1940, B-Dienst received a number of captured documents from HMS Hardy, a destroyer which was grounded in the Ofotfjord in the Battle of Narvik during the Norwegian Campaign, but when Bergen was being evacuated by the British, they left a large cache of British cryptography documents behind which were discovered in May 1940. These included a copy of the Administrative Code, a copy of the Foreign Office Interdepartmental Cypher No.1, the current Merchant Navy Code with recoding tables and the Auxiliary Code and Recoding Tables along with Call Signs and Delivery Groups. The four-letter, two-part codes, called B25, B30 and B31 by Pers Z S, had a more significant message content. B25 and B31 were considered most important by Pers Z S. The five-figure Interdepartmental Cipher, compromised at Bergen, was worked on in 1941 and 1942, the bulk of the work being done by Hermann Görings Forschungsamt (abbr FA).
United States of America	The Pers Z S main successes included the solution to the Grey Code, called B3 by Pers Z S, the Brown Code B8 and the USA State Department strip system. The Grey Code had been in use since June 1918 and the Brown Code since 1938. Both systems were readable, the Brown Code having been compromised in 1941. The Strip System O-1 was partially read in 1941, and the Strip System O-2 was solved in early 1943 There was a delay of months in reading the two Strip Systems.
Vatican	A 1940 report of the Italian Group, created by Adolf Paschke, made it clear that although approximately 50% of the Vatican traffic could be read, the traffic was not a major Pers Z S commitment. A one-part, three-letter code, enciphered by a transposition within the groups, and to a one-part figure code, enciphered by means of a substitution alphabets and a sliding strip. Most of the book groups were secured from the Goerings's FA.

=== Pers Z Chi ===
Little was known of the Pers Z S Encryption Service (German:Chiffrier-dienst). It was responsible for the compilation, preparation and distribution of the codes and cyphers used by the Foreign Office. Per Z S personnel consulted with Pers Z Chi on matters of security. Senior Specialist Horst Hauthal was responsible for Pers Z Chi between 1943-1945. Prior to that, its head was Senior Specialist Langlotz, who died in 1953.

Pers Z S used the T52c teleprinter cipher machines for secure communications, but these were known to be cryptologically weak.

== Liaison ==
=== Liaison with General der Nachrichtenaufklärung ===
As regards Inspectorate 7/VI, (OKH/Chi), the cipher department of the German Army (Wehrmacht), and the concomitant unit that grew out of the In OKH/GdNA, there were few examples of collaboration between it and Pers Z S at the senior administrative level. Dr Otto Buggisch, formerly of Inspektorate 7/VI and later OKW/Chi, gave the only available information to TICOM. Dr Buggisch worked in the French language group in Inspektorate 7 from November 1941 until August 1942 and during this period he collaborated with Dr Kunze on a five-digit DeGaulle code. He also worked Dr Kunze regarding the Swiss Enigma General Alfred Jodl, Chief of the Armed Forces Operations Staff (Oberkommando der Wehrmacht) stated he did not receive any decodes as they went directly to the Foreign minister, but knew in a general way Pers Z S professionalism and commitment. The general lack of collaboration between Pers Z S and Inspektorate 7 did not point to lack of coordination at senior administrative function, nor to professional jealously between the two agencies. Essentially the two agencies had two distinct operational foci. Pers Z S was diplomatic and OKH/Chi was a military agency. Therefore, there was little need for detailed collaboration.

=== Liaison with B-Dienst ===
As with the Army, the Navy B-Dienst had few occasions to work with Pers Z S. Their operation and tactical problem domain's were too dissimilar to stimulate effective collaboration. Admiral Karl Dönitz, stated:

[he] had no knowledge of the cryptanalytic bureaus maintained by the other services and departments... As for civil bureaus, he had never tried to find out, [as] they were of no use to him.

Wilhelm Tranow of the B-Dienst knew Schauffler slightly and they had once collaborated over Japanese intercepts, but Tranow never had the time to address them. Hagen reported in 1942 that the English desk had sent their results on the British B30 and B31 cyphers to B-Dienst, but had received nothing in return. It may, perhaps, not have occurred to Hagen that the cyphers would have been of no interest to B-Dienst, as Pers Z S cryptanalysts were never exposed to the intelligence value of intercepts, in the same manner that other agency staff sometimes were.

=== Liaison with Luftnachrichten Abteilung 350 ===
Similar to the other agency, the Luftwaffe cipher bureau, Luftnachrichten Abteilung 350, earlier called chi-stelle, was primarily interested in intercepts emanating from its Allied counterparts. As a military agency, diplomatic traffic would have probably been outside its scope. However, there were two main concomitant instances of collaboration. According to Dr Schauffler, the first of these occurred in 1939, when Dr Kunze was approached by the Luftnachrichten Abteilung 350 for assistance on British weather ciphers Nothing is known as to the extent of the success of the collaborative effort.

The second area of collaboration was noted by Chief Cryptanalyst Specialist Erich Hüttenhain of the OKW/Chi on a Letter dated July 27, 1943 which stated:

Three weeks ago a discussion was held in the Foreign Office between Dr Kunze [and] Regierungsrat Dr Ferdinand Voegele, (Chief of the Luftwaffe cryptanalysts). Dr Voegele declared his willingness to cooperate on the AM10 cypher, (German name for a U.S Strip System) and Dr Kunze declared his willingness to provide the necessary material.

Voegele was held off for a fortnight. When he pressed for the production of the promised material, Dr. Kunze stated that he had changed his mind and would not be providing the material, as Dr. Voegele had made disparaging remarks about his work.

Suggestion: LIV or he head of the OKW/Chi should arrange for Paschke for the already planned collaboration of Pers Z S with the OKL-Stelle OBdL actually to come into force. Should Pers Z S not consent, OKW/Chi will terminate the agreement with Pers Z S to get a free hand, so that OKW/Chi can collaborate with the Air Force...

This incident is not mentioned in the Pers Z S or Dr Voegele interrogations. Military historian David Alvarez stated that the reason the cooperation deal collapsed was that Voegele had made disparaging remarks about Dr. Kunze's work.

=== Liaison with Forschungsamt ===
An unsigned letter, dated 23 February 1934, that was probably written by Dr Paschke stated:

Captain Hans Oschmann...mentioned an utterance by his chief, Korvettenkapitaen Paztzig, to the effect that all cryptanalytic connections with the Forschungsamt should be dropped, since cryptanalytic work did not belong in the province of the Forschungsamt.

The letter probably does not represent the then Pers Z S attitude, but it does constitute the first indication in the Pers Z S TICOM documentation to a new third competitor Goering's Research Office of the Reich Air Ministry, informally called the Forschungsamt. The later material of Pers Z S collaboration is fragmentary and none later than 1942. Although no dates are given, Hermann Göring stated:

...the Foreign Office had continuously tried to interfere [with the Research bureau].

The statement might have been motivated by his professional competitive and aversion to Joachim von Ribbentrop, the diplomat and foreign minister under the Nazi regime but also that both agencies covered the same field and that there was unfortunately almost complete duplication. Dr Paschke's statement that in general there was "less liaison with the Forschungsamt than with the OKW/Chi".

Paschke, in homework for TICOM stated:

I may loyally affirm that the workers of the FA collaborated with us openly and honorably, withheld nothing from me and this furthered our work.

The unit received a certain amount of its intercepts from the FA. Until November 1943, when the FA was bombed, it acted as the forwarding agent for the traffic intercepted by the Postoffice, both radiogram and cablegrams intercept traffic, which was forwarded to Pers Z S directly After the FA was bombed out, the unit received the intercepts direct from the Postoffice. There was little evidence of an official liaison between the two bureaus. Minister Seifert of the FA stated that intelligence produced by the FA was distributed to all departments including the Pers Z S...At some of these departments we had a liaison officers. A Dr. Gerstmeyer is details as the FA-Pers Z S Liaison Officers (German:Verbingungs-mann). Sauerbier of the FA stated that liaison with the unit ... was handled by a single representative, and never involved any exchange of visits by operations personnel

When the Pers Z S was interrogated by TICOM Team 1, they first learned the existence of the FA from the foreign office cryptanalysts, who knew the names of many of the section heads in Department IV in which their work was related The Yearly Report for 1942 from AA/Per Z S inter alia, reveals an exchange of code book recoveries. The name of Senior Specialist Waechter of the FA appears in the Yearly Report and the names of other FA personnel occur in the code books stored in the AA/Per Z archives. From this evidence it is clear that technical cryptanalyst liaison existed between the FA and the AA/Per Z.

Out of this evidence the following tentative assertions can be made for the period 1940-1942:

1. There was extensive duplication of effort between AA/Pers Z S and the FA.
2. There was an official liaison between the FA and AA/Pers Z S, but it did not seem to be fully operative.
3. There was significant amount of technical cryptanalyst liaison when both agencies were working on the same problem, with a concomitant exchange of information.
4. It was unknown whether the liaison continued until the end of the war.

== Notes ==
TICOM, the United States effort to seize German Intelligence after World War 2, document archive consists of 11 primary documents Volume I to Volume IX. These primary volumes, are aggregate summary documentation, each volume targeting a specific German military agency. The archive also consists of Team Reports, DF-Series, I-Series, IF-Series and M-series reports which cover various aspects of TICOM interrogation.

Volume VI which covers AA/Pers ZS contains over 50 references to the I-Series TICOM documents which are TICOM Intelligence reports, and covers references to the full gamut of the other types of reports, e.g. DF-Series, IF-Series, of which there are over 1500 reports. The following are those document directly referenced in this article:

- TICOM I-22 Interrogation of German Cryptographers of Pers ZS Department of the Auswäertiges Amt. 2 July 1945 (PDF). TICOM.
- "TICOM I-54 Second interrogation of Five Members of the RLM/Forschungsamt. 2 August 1945" (PDF). TICOM.
- TICOM I-58 Interrogation of Dr. Otto Buggisch of OKW/CHI 8 August 1945 (PDF). TICOM.
- "TICOM I-63 Interrogation Report on ORR Herrmann Scherschmidt of Per ZS Auswäertiges Amt. 11 August 1945" (PDF). TICOM.
- "TICOM I-89 Report by Dr H. Rohrbach on Pers. ZS on American Strip Cypher [0-2 Cypher] August 6, 1945" (PDF). TICOM.
- TICOM I-103 Second Interrogation of R.R. Hermann Scherschmidt of Pers. Z S Auswärtiges Amt, on Turkish and Bulgarian Systems. 19 September 1945 (PDF). TICOM.
- TICOM I-143 Report on the Interrogation of Five Leading Germans at Nuremberg on 27 September 1945 (PDF). TICOM.
- TICOM I-172 Interrogations of Hagen and Paschke of Pers ZS. 6 December 1945 (PDF). TICOM.
- "TICOM I-208 Interrogation report on Kurt Selchow, Former head of the Pers ZS Department of the German Ministry of Foreign Affairs 27 October 1947" (PDF). TICOM.
- TICOM D-60 Miscellaneous Papers from a file of RR Dr. Erich Hüttenhain of OKW/Chi. 6 December 1945 (PDF). TICOM.

=== Missing TICOM Documents ===
- I-1 Notes and Minutes of High-Level Meetings held at OKW/Chi.
- I-84 Further Interrogation of R. R. Dr. Huettenhain and Sdf. Dr. Fricke of OKW/Chi
- I-147 Detailed Interrogation of Members of OKM 4/SKL III at Flensburg.
- I-163 Report on Interrogation of Hauptmann Scheidl, Lieutenant Sann and Lieutenant Smolin, all of I/LN Rgt. 353 (East), on German Sigint Activity Against Russian Air Forces.
- D-16 Translation of Annual Progress Reports by Pers ZS covering 1927, 1941, 1942.
- DF-17 Translation of T 3273, letter of Dr. Paschke and other Pers ZS personnel. Translated by Dr. Pettengill. (T-165).
