= Schauffler =

Schauffler is a surname. Notable people with the surname include:

- Robert Haven Schauffler (1879–1964), American writer, cellist, athlete, and war hero
- Rudolf Schauffler (1889-1968) German scientist
- William Gottlieb Schauffler (1798–1883), German missionary
