= Alshehbazia hauthalii =

Scientific classification
- Kingdom: Plantae
- Clade: Tracheophytes
- Clade: Angiosperms
- Clade: Eudicots
- Clade: Rosids
- Order: Brassicales
- Family: Brassicaceae
- Genus: Alshehbazia; Salariato & Zuloaga
- Species: A. hauthalii

Binomial name
- Alshehbazia hauthalii (Gilg & Muschl.) Salariato & Zuloaga

Synonyms
- Brayopsis hauthalii (Gilg & Muschl.) Skottsb.; Brayopsis skottsbergii Gilg; Eudema hauthalii Gilg & Muschl.; Onuris hauthalii (Gilg & Muschl.) Al-Shehbaz

Species of flowering plant

Alshehbazia hauthalii is a species of flowering plant belonging to the family Brassicaceae. It is a subshrub native to west-northwestern and southern Argentina and southern Chile.

The species was first described as Eudema hauthalii by Ernst Friedrich Gilg and Reinhold Conrad Muschler in 1909. In 2015 it was placed in the new genus Alshehbazia as Alshehbazia hauthalii, published in Kew Bull. Vol.70 (Issue 4).

The genus name of Alshehbazia is in honour of Ihsan Ali Al-Shehbaz, Ph.D. (born 1939 in Iraq) is an Iraqi American botanist who works as adjunct professor at University of Missouri-St. Louis and Senior Curator at Missouri Botanical Garden. The Latin specific epithet of hauthalii refers to Horst Hauthal (1913–2002) a former German ambassador.
