= James Lyman Merrick =

First American missionary to Muslims in Persia (1803–1866)

James Lyman Merrick (11 December 1803 in Monson, Massachusetts – 18 June 1866 in Amherst, Massachusetts) was the first American missionary to Muslims in Persia, and in 1852 became Professor of Oriental Literature at Amherst College.

== Early life ==
As a young man, Merrick was caught up in the zeal for Christian missions that swept through New England after the formation of the American Board of Commissioners of Foreign Missions (ABCFM) in 1810. Merrick's diaries showed that he had come to Amherst College—which in that era focused on training ministers—already intent on serving as a missionary to Persia.

== Missionary works ==
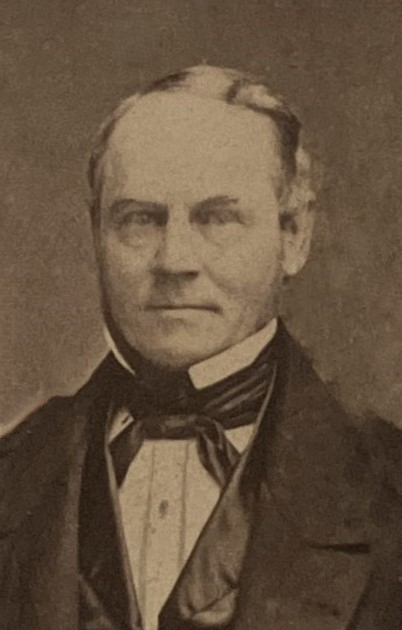
James Lyman Merrick portrait (c. 1850s)

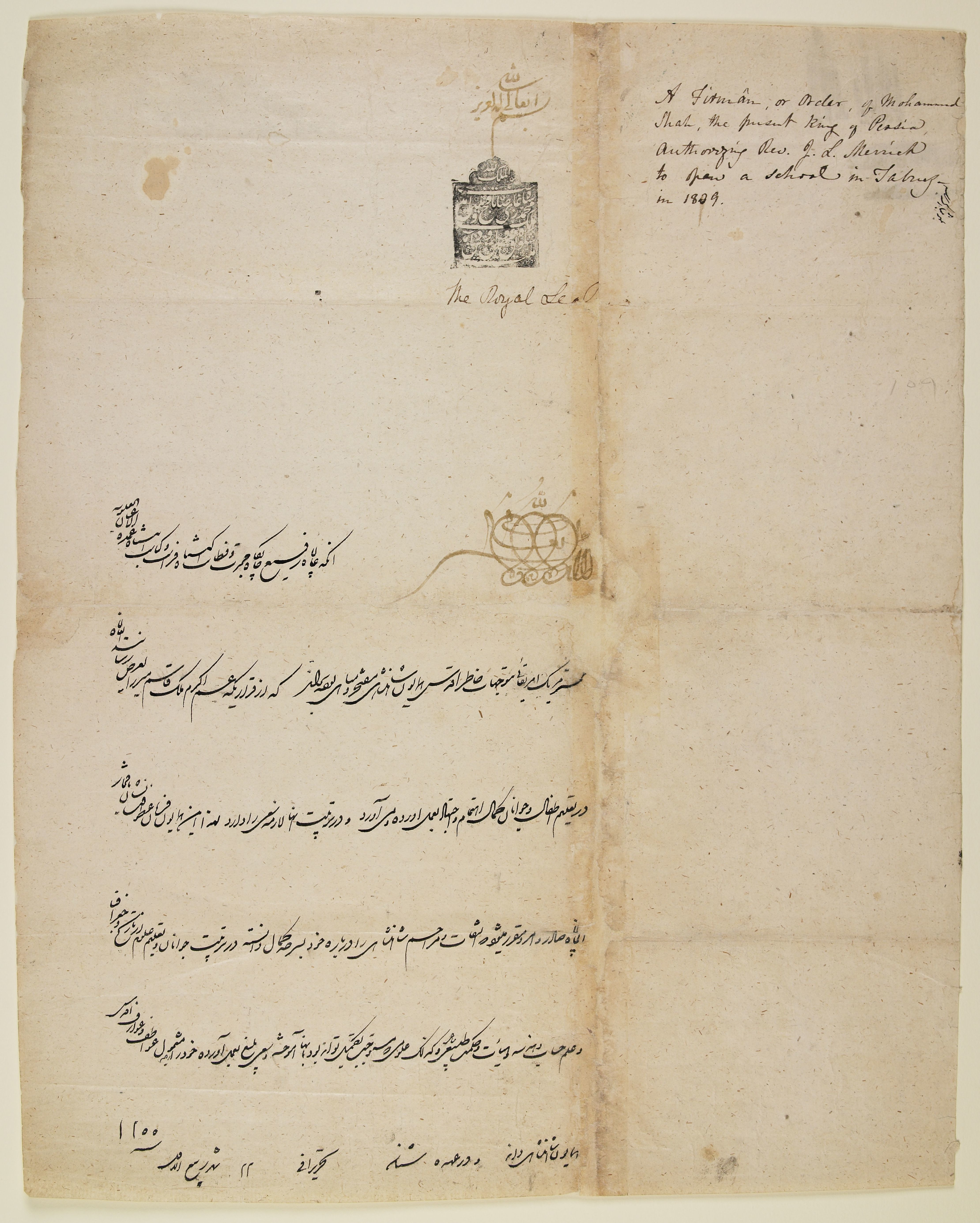
1839 royal firman written in Persian, granting James L. Merrick the right to establish a school in the city of Tabriz. Issued by prince Malek Qasem Mirza in Tabriz with the seal of then reigning Shah Mohammad Shah Qajar (r. 1834-1848)

After graduating from Amherst in 1830, Merrick began theological studies at Princeton, then completed his education at the newly formed theological seminary in Columbia, South Carolina. In 1834 he was appointed by the American Board to pioneer missionary work among Persian Muslims. That summer, he left from Boston for Istanbul, where he studied Turkish and prepared for his Persian mission under the supervision of veteran missionaries William Gottlieb Schauffler and William Goodell.

In August 1835, Merrick moved to Tabriz, Iran, where he joined a group of German missionaries and began Persian studies. The following summer, he traveled to Tehran, then to Isfahan, accompanied by two of the German missionaries. Violent opposition arose in Isfahan in response to the Germans' distribution of Persian New Testaments. The incident seems to have reinforced Merrick's conviction that open evangelism would be unfruitful among Persians. Thereafter he would consistently advocate a patient, respectful, and non-confrontational approach toward missionary work in Muslim lands.

The Germans abandoned their plans and returned to Tabriz, while Merrick continued on to Persepolis and Shiraz. In Shiraz, Merrick studied Persian and Arabic under the tutelage of a Sufi scholar, Mullā Muhammad. He was befriended by Mīrzā Sayyid Alī, who had assisted Henry Martyn in translating the New Testament into Persian. By the end of his stay in Shiraz, Merrick was optimistic, and convinced that he could work as a missionary in any city in Persia.

In March 1837 he returned to Tabriz, but because of ill health left to spend a year with the Nestorian mission in Urumia. There he met Malik Qāsim Mīrzā, an uncle of the Shah, and spent three months in his residence teaching English, learning Persian and discussing religion. Finally in August 1838 he settled in Tabriz, intending to make it his permanent base, and the following year he married Eunice Taylor, the sister of an English army officer stationed in Persia. Merrick was joined in Tabriz by William Glen, a Scottish missionary who, during the next four years would translate the Old Testament into Persian. In Tabriz he wrote A Friendly Tract, which is in Persian and is the first Persian text written by an American. He also worked on a translation of Muḥammad Bāqir al-Majlisī's Hayāt al-Qulūb into English with the intent of increasing the literacy of English readers about the foundations of Shi'a Islam. This work was later published as The Life & Religion of Mohammed. He also adapted and translated a work on astronomy into Persian.

In November 1839, the executive committee of the American Board, which had already expressed doubts about the viability of Merrick's mission, withdrew its support for his work among Muslims. He was instructed to join the ABCFM mission to Nestorian Christians in Urumia. Merrick resisted, but in 1942 he received a letter from the Board's secretary, Rufus Anderson, ordering him to leave Tabriz.

In Urumia, Merrick completed a Persian translation of Alexander Keith's Evidence of Prophecy and began learning Syriac. Conflict with his missionary colleagues over mission policies led to further deterioration in relations with the American Board executive, culminating in his recall in 1845.

After his return to the United States, stung by criticism of his mission, Merrick published a caustic appeal to the American Board in which he sought to vindicate his record and accused the board of betraying the cause of missions to Muslims. In 1849 Merrick became pastor of the South Amherst Congregational Church and was Professor of Oriental Literature at Amherst College from 1852 to 1857. In 1850 he published The Life and Religion of Mohammed, his translation of al-Majlisī's Hayāt al-Qulūb.
