= Wilhelm Fenner =

- Born: Wilhelm Fenner; 14 April 1891; Saint Petersburg, Russian Empire
- Died: 25 July 1961 (aged 70); Bonn, North Rhine-Westphalia, West Germany
- Spouse: Elise Sophie Katharine von Blanckensee
- Parent(s): Heinrich Gottlieb Fenner, Charlotte Georgine Fenner
- Engineering career
- Discipline: Cryptography
- Institutions: Royal Institute of Technology
- Significant advance: Cryptology

Wilhelm Fenner (14 April 1891 – 25 July 1961) was a German cryptanalyst, before and during the time of World War II in the OKW/Chi, the Cipher Department of the High Command of the Wehrmacht, working within the main cryptanalysis group, and entrusted with deciphering enemy message traffic (Cryptography). Wilhelm Fenner was considered an excellent organizer, an anti-Nazi, an anti-Bolshevik and a confirmed Protestant and was known by colleagues as someone who was keen to continue working in cryptology after World War II. To quote military historian David Alvarez:

Wilhelm Fenner was the central figure in the evolution of the German Cipher Bureau between 1922 and 1939, and a major personality in the history of German communications intelligence in the interwar period. Under his direction, the Cipher Bureau evolved into a highly professional communications intelligence service, which scored impressive cryptanalytic successes against the diplomatic and military systems of many countries.

== Personal life ==
Wilhelm Fenner was born on 14 April 1891 in Saint Petersburg. He was the sixth of seven children of Heinrich Gottlieb Fenner and Charlotte Georgine Fenner, née Michaelsen. His father was the chief editor of the St. Petersburgische Zeitung, a German language daily newspaper published in Saint Petersburg, then the capital of the Russian Empire. The sixth of seven children, he was home schooled for two years before he attended the evangelical lutheran Anne School in St. Petersburg from 189. He completed his final examination with distinction in May 1909. In the autumn of 1910, he matriculated at the Royal Institute of Technology in Berlin (TH) in Berlin-Charlottenburg and studied construction engineering, chemistry and metallurgy. In the summer of 1914, he passed his final examination.

Fenner was married on 11 January 1922 to Elise Sophie Katharine von Blanckensee, a daughter of the former Prussian Major General Peter von Blanckensee. They had two children, a son, Siegwart Heinrich (born 28 January 1923), who served as a lieutenant in World War II, and was killed on 19 February 1945, and a daughter, Ilse Fredericki (born 24 July 1928).

== First World War ==
With the outbreak of the First World War, he had to drop out of college, and worked for a short time at Siemens as an engineer, working to develop electrical systems for warships. He was drafted into military service on 1 December 1914, joining the 5th Guards Grenadiers, seeing service in Russia, France and Serbia and eventually joined the staff of the Tenth Army. After the armistice in November 1918, he remained under arms as a member of one of the Free Corps battalions of demobilized soldiers who offered their services to political groups jockeying for political position in Germany in the first months of peace. After the war, now with the rank of lieutenant, he remained in the military until 9 February 1920. When Fenner returned to civilian life, he took a job as a publicist with an émigré assistance organization, but the position provided little interest and within the year, he took a position as an editor in a new press agency, which was founded by Konstantin von Krusenstern, who was a former colonel in the Imperial Russian Army. The fledgling news agency collapsed, with Krusenstern relocating to Paris, but before he left, Fenner's career took a decisive turn when the Russian colonel introduced him to Peter Novopaschenny in the spring of 1921.

== Meeting Novopaschenny and Buschenhagen ==
Peter Novopashenny was a former Russian Navy captain of the tsarist Marine and professor of Applied Tactics. Novopaschenny asked Fenner to help him to move to Berlin and confided in Fenner that he had worked during the war as director of the Russian cryptanalytic service working to break the ciphers of the German Baltic Fleet, and that he intended to make his experience available to the German General Staff, under the terms of the Treaty of Versailles. In the same year, Fenner provided him with contacts, eventually becoming an acquaintance of an officer called Erich Buschenhagen, who would later become a general in the Wehrmacht. In 1919, Buschenhagen had set up Volunteer Evaluation Post which had been absorbed into Germany's postwar military establishment as a cipher bureau of the army's Troops Department, which was allowed under the terms of the peace agreement.

== Establishment of Reichswehr cipher bureau ==
As Buschenhagen's cipher bureau was primary working on Russian ciphers, he jumped at the change of using Novopaschenny, but less so Fenner, who knew little of Russian ciphers. Fenner became interested in the Russian telegrams that Novopaschenny was working on, and with his interest piqued, began the process of discovering the field of cryptanalysis. He was now working under the guidance of his "teacher", Novopaschenny, a fruitful relationship, and together they were successful in breaking Russian military ciphers. Fenner's excellent command of the German and Russian languages worked to his advantage, while Novopaschenny, although an excellent cryptanalyst, spoke hardly any German. Buschenhagen was particularly impressed when the pair decrypted a Russian cipher that was beyond the skill of the cipher bureau's own 4 person Russian desk. In the autumn of 1922, he and Novopaschenny were not only officially taken into the employment of the cryptanalysis group of the Reichswehr (Chi-point) by Buschenhagen, but Fenner was also appointed as head of the cryptanalysis section and assigned a staff of eleven. Fenner was initially unimpressed by the cipher bureau personnel, output was modest with too narrow scope of operation, and cryptanalysts happy to decrypt three or four messages a day combined with lax work habits. Within the next years Fenner changed the operation of his group significantly. From a chaotic assembly of creative "geniuses", he formed an analytical, systematic and disciplined unit of more, and more experienced, code breakers. In this process, Fenner introduced a uniform, clear technical terminology into the field of cryptanalysis, laying the groundwork for further successes by his new employer. His first action was introducing formal training, conducted personal lectures describing various types of cryptographic systems. His actions bore fruit, and the number of successfully decrypted messages increased steadily. The group also grew in numbers, and Fenner took the opportunity to train newcomers himself and transfer his own, now greatly developed, knowledge of cryptology to them. However, his growing leadership role caused him to start losing contact with the actual cryptanalytic work, and gained a reputation as a fearsome, arrogant pedant, which he dismissed as evidence the unit was being shaken out of its lethargy. By the mid 1920s, he had introduced a 90 training course for senior analysts which reviewed current systems and general principles. By the 1930s a fast track training course was introduced for talented newcomers that met twice a week and covered a two part course in cryptologic principles and practice.

As part of his process to professionalize the unit, he sought to gain recognition and establish career level status for his staff, as he was convinced that a staff member would serve the state loyally, if their well-being was undertaken by the state. As the arcane skills of his staff did not fit in any of the German career hierarchy, they were not considered career civil servants and so had no career progression, pensions nor job security. The process was long and arduous, beginning in the early 1920s and was fully completed until late 1939, with the outbreak of World War II and shortly after establishment of the Supreme Command of the Armed Forces the Chiffrierstelle was renamed the Cipher Department of the High Command of the Wehrmacht (OKW/Chi), that the plan was approved by the chief of the Supreme Command of the Wehrmacht, Wilhelm Keitel. Professionalism for Fenner was always a means to an end. The whole process was about improved production and an expansion of operations.

On 4 April 1927 he was appointed a Government Councillor (Regierungsrat). In addition to his management duties he increased contact and cooperation with friendly foreign groups in Austria, Hungary and Finland, and later Italy, Spain and Estonia He provided training, and wrote two treatises on cryptanalysis, namely Grundlagen der Entzifferung (fundamentals of code-breaking) and Beitrag zur Theorie der Schieber (contribution to the theory of the strip cipher). He also worked on the Enigma machine, then already in trial use by the Reichswehr, pointing out cryptographic weaknesses, and making proposals for its improvement. By 1924, Fenner had identified in the intercept traffic, 85 codes and ciphers, of which 22 has been attached and 16 had been cryptanalysed successfully. In June 1927, Fenner went to Finland to deliver a course of instruction to the members of the new fledgling service of the Finish cipher bureau.

== Rivals ==
Pers Z S was the civilian Signals Intelligence Agency of the German Foreign Office. Pers Z S believed it has a monopoly on diplomatic communication traffic and was also a rival to Reichswehr Cipher bureau. It dealt specifically with diplomatic ciphers and relied on the German Post Office for diplomatic intercepts, who transmitted and received the encrypted communications from embassies located in Germany, and across the world. The post service routinely retained copies of all embassy messages and passed the messages to Per Z S cryptanalysts for study and the Post Office only dealt with the Foreign Ministry. Fenner argued that OKW/Chi needed diplomatic traffic as they included information of military interest and military analysts were more likely to identify such items in messages and understand their significance. He convinced his opposite number in the foreign office ministry Kurt Selchow, that cooperation would benefit both units. Specifically, he promised Selchow that as the OKW/Chi expanded and improved its radio monitoring network, the foreign ministry cryptanalysts would have access to all diplomatic messages intercepted. Fenner also offered access to share other OKW/Chi materials and results. The result of the inter-agency collaboration was considered rare in a normally hostile and competitive German intelligence community.

== Nazi seizure of power ==
Within the Reichswehr bureau, a small circle of Nazi sympathizers became increasingly vocal. Fenner had little patience with these people, who talked politics during extended coffee breaks and who flaunted their loyalties by smoking Nazi Party cigarettes, or occasionally missed work to participate in a Jew raid. After the seizure of power by the Nazis in January 1933, the times became increasingly restless, and the situation worsened for the cipher bureau, which now felt the competition from newly established rival institutions. In 1933, for example, Goering's new Luftwaffe created its own intelligence agency, the Forschungsamt. During this period Fenner worried about the professionalism of the agency as the Nazi Party tried to extend their control over the intelligence and security agencies of the state.

Many capable employees of the cipher bureau joined the new organisation, where they hoped for better career prospects. Among these were cryptanalysts whom Fenner considered excellent, their leader Reznicek, an ardent Nazi and cryptanalyst assigned to the Italian desk and Herr Weachter. Reznicek was particularly annoyed that in the caste conscious world of German bureaucracy, he was a mere employee of the Bureau, while Fenner was a Government Councillor with a pensioner. Gottfried Schapper, a radio intelligence operator from World War I, who ran a unit in the Bureau that was concerned with the location and construction of fixed intercept stations. Hans Schimpf was another. Fenner may have been glad to see the malcontents go, but he quickly discovered he was not entirely rid of them. From either a desire to revenge themselves on their former employer or to expand their influence, Schimpf and Schapper informed Fenner that the Forschungsamt was now solely responsible for all diplomatic cryptanalysis and that the Bureau should abandon all such work. This was of course a repeat of the last bureaucratic battle with the Pers Z S. However, Fenner found an ally in Kurt Selchow, who realized that if successfully prosecuted, the Forschungsamt's supposed monopoly on diplomatic cryptanalysis would mean the end of the Foreign Ministry. Even though Fenner managed to see off the threat, the Forschungsamt staff started a campaign to have him relieved of duty, tapped his office phone, planted an informant in his office and started spreading rumours that he was Jewish, and that he had ridiculed and criticized Hermann Göring in private conversations. Fenner was forced to fill the resulting gaps with newcomers, necessarily having to forgo experience in favour of attitude in selection of candidates. Fenner as a rule always recruited people who had not left the church and were not members of the NSDAP. During this time, Fenner's Bureau found it increasingly difficult to fend off competitors, with the German navies organization B-Dienst and the German armies Intercept Control Station both cipher agencies, seeking new staff. Fenner actively opposed the army bureau, but could not block its creation. OKW/Chi was explicitly ordered to cease work on Russian military ciphers, which Fenner disobeyed, ordering a small covert party to continue working on Russian and French military systems. In the summer of 1933, he was promoted to Senior Councillor (German: OberRegierungsrat). By the start of World War II, he was a Director of OKW/CHI (German: :Ministerialrat) which meant he could counteract the harmful poaching of staff, ensure suitable staff had a secure future, and place unsuitable people at the disposal of others.

The staff strength of the Chiffrierstelle (OKW/Chi) had increased in 1939 to include over 200 employees, whereas only two years earlier there were about 40 personnel. In the ensuing war years until 1944 it quadrupled to 800. The wartime for Fenner and his staff in the OKW/Chi was initially relatively peaceful and successful. The raw material, in the form of intercepted radio messages, was prolific; they concentrated on several hundred messages a day on the most important projects and had to ignore relatively unimportant sources. They had important decoding success (German: Entzifferungserfolge), for example, against France, in 1940, which aided the quick victory of the German Armed Forces in the West—"Case Red". Also Polish, Russian and Yugoslav messages could be deciphered.

== Impact of war ==
While his section chief, Colonel Kettler, and the head of the main group A, Major Mettig, and also one of its best people, the head of the group IV, Dr Erich Hüttenhain, relocated to the north, Fenner fled south with a selection of employees. On 23 April 1945, OKW/Chi was officially disbanded and the staff of the General of Nachrichtenaufklärung (gDNA) assumed their responsibilities. Just before the American army reached their position (about 40 km south of Salzburg), documents were burned or thrown into the Salzach River. With the surrender of the Wehrmacht on 8 May 1945, Fenner moved to Landshut and found employment as a bicycle and car mechanic in neighboring Straubing.

== Witness at Nuremberg war crimes trial ==
In July 1946, Fenner was charged as a witness for the Nuremberg war crimes tribunal and in August transferred to the Haus Alaska, a cover name for HQ 7707 European Command Intelligence Center Camp King, the US Army's interrogation centre, Oberursel (near Frankfurt), and interned with other high-ranking Germans. Fenner was intensively interrogated by the Army Security Agency (ASA) and wrote a number of reports about his life and work, including an autobiographical essay "The Career of William Fenner"—its English translation bearing the words TOP SECRET being filed in TICOM Archive: DF-187. These documents were made publicly available in 2008.
