= Rudolf Schauffler =

German mathematician

Rudolf Schauffler (born 11 August 1889 in Ulm– died 6 February 1968) was a German mathematician, who was most notable for being the nominal head of the Linguistics and Cryptanalysis section of Pers Z S, the Signal Intelligence Agency of the German Foreign Office (German: Auswärtiges Amt) before and during World War II.

== Life ==
Before World War I, Schauffler had been a schoolmaster after studying mathematics, physics and languages at the University of Tübingen and the Ludwig-Maximilians-Universität München. During World War I, he was gassed. During the first world war, Schauffler worked as a cryptanalyst at the German army headquarters. After the war, Schauffler found the work of schoolmaster to be too difficult and decided to join Pers Z S. Schauffler was recruited by Kurt Selchow and joined on 1 December 1918. Selchow also recruited Werner Kunze, Adolf Paschke, Karl Zastrow, Wilhelm Brandes, and Ernst Hoffmann for the unit as he had known them during the war.

Although he did not have a Doctor of Philosophy degree nor did he habilitate while in office, Schauffler was most definitely a real mathematician. The mathematician and cryptographer Erich Hüttenhain in his evaluation of Schauffler regarded him as a true scientist.

"Die Handelsmaschine", one of the early cipher machines examined by Schauffler

Very early in his career, he wrote two papers in 1917 and 1921 for the Mathematische Annalen mathematical research journal. After the war he wrote a thesis in 1941 but did not submit it until 1947 to Marburg University. The subject was on cryptography: An application of cyclic permutations and their theory (German: Eine Anwendung zyklischer Permutationen und ihre Theorie). It had not been submitted due to the contents being secret. He was promoted to Doctor of Philosophy in 1948. In 1956 and 1957, he wrote two further papers, the first of these was on the theory of Check digit systems.

In 1967, the historian David Kahn interviewed Schauffler in his apartment for his 1967 book, The Codebreakers and found it most depressing. Kahn wrote of Schauffler:

Elderly, not old, but broken by sickness and the ersatz food of the war years, he shuffled around his chilly apartment, barely able to put a pot of water on for tea. As rain dripped slowly from the gray sky, he ended our talk by saying, “A bridge builder can see what he has done for his countrymen, but we (German codebreakers) cannot tell whether our life was worth anything.”

== Career ==
Initially, Schauffler worked on cryptographic metholologies. During the period from 1921 to 1923, Schauffler worked as part a team that included Werner Kunze on the development of a one-time pad system for the use by the Foreign Office. He later became interested in Chinese and Japanese languages while sharing an office with Emil Krebs, who taught him, eventually becoming a specialist in both languages over a period of twenty years. Schauffler later focused on theoretical research that became his main field of interest. In 1923, he examined the rotor cipher machine, the Enigma machine, specifically the early design known as "Die Handelsmaschine" (The trading machine) and wrote a report explaining the dangers of decipherment.

He later edited the in-house journal, Scientific Writings of the Dahlem Special Service, (German:Wissenschaftliche Schriften des Sonderdienstes Dahlem).

In 1950, the Federal Foreign Office tasked Selchow along with Schauffler, Erich Hüttenhain and Heinz Kuntze to form a cryptographic service under the direction of Adolf Paschke that was called Section 114. The service was to act as a cypher bureau for the Central office of Encryption (ZfCh) (German: Zentralstelle für das Chiffrierwesen) that had been previously created in 1947 and was located at Camp King. In 1955, the unit was disbanded as West Germany was rearming, and a new unit was to be created. In 1956 all the equipment and resources of the unit were transferred to the Federal Intelligence Service (Germany). In 1989 the unit was renamed to ZFI (German: Zentralstelle für Sicherheit in der Informationstechnik). In 1991, it became the BSI (Federal Office for Information Security)

== Bibliography ==
- Schauffler, Rudolf (December 1917). "Über wiederholte Funktionen". Mathematische Annalen. 78 (1–4): 52–62. doi:10.1007/BF01457088. S2CID 119474137.
- Schauffler, Rudolf (March 1921). "Über wiederholbare Funktionen". Mathematische Annalen. 84 (1–2): 137–142. doi:10.1007/BF01458698. S2CID 122737980.
- Schauffler, Rudolf (1956). "Über die Bildung von Codew€orten". Archiv der elektrischen Übertragung (in German).
- Schauffler, Rudolf (December 1957). "Die Assoziativität im Ganzen, besonders bei Quasigruppen". Mathematische Zeitschrift (in German). 67 (1): 428–435. doi:10.1007/BF01258874. S2CID 121466999.
- Schauffler, Rudolf (1962). "Erinnerungen eines Kryptologen" [Memories of a cryptologist]. Politisches Archiv des Auswärtigen Amts (in German). VS-6025. Berlin: Auswärtiges Amt.
