= Alshehbazia friesii =

Scientific classification
- Kingdom: Plantae
- Clade: Embryophytes
- Clade: Tracheophytes
- Clade: Angiosperms
- Clade: Eudicots
- Clade: Rosids
- Order: Brassicales
- Family: Brassicaceae
- Genus: Alshehbazia
- Species: A. friesii

Binomial name
- Alshehbazia friesii (O.E.Schulz) Salariato, Zuloaga & Al-Shehbaz

Synonyms
- Eudema friesii O.E.Schulz (1924); Petroravenia friesii (O.E.Schulz) Al-Shehbaz

Species of flowering plant

Alshehbazia friesii is a species of flowering plant in the family Brassicaceae. It is a subshrub native to subalpine regions of the Andes from southern Peru to Bolivia, northern Chile, and northwestern Argentina.

It was first described as Eudema friesii by Otto Eugen Schulz in 1924. In 2012 it was transferred to Petroravenia because of the lack of septum diving the fruit into chambers. In 2019 it was transferred to genus Alshehbazia as Alshehbazia friesii.
