= Alshehbazia =

Scientific classification
- Kingdom: Plantae
- Clade: Tracheophytes
- Clade: Angiosperms
- Clade: Eudicots
- Clade: Rosids
- Clade: Malvids
- Order: Brassicales
- Family: Brassicaceae
- Genus: Alshehbazia; Salariato & Zuloaga

Genus of flowering plants

Alshehbazia is a genus of flowering plants belonging to the family Brassicaceae. It contains three species native to the Andes of South America, ranging from Peru to southern Argentina and Chile.

== Species ==
Three species are accepted.

- Alshehbazia friesii (O.E.Schulz) Salariato, Zuloaga & Al-Shehbaz
- Alshehbazia hauthalii (Gilg & Muschl.) Salariato & Zuloaga
- Alshehbazia werdermannii (O.E.Schulz) Salariato, Zuloaga & Al-Shehbaz

== Taxonomy ==
The genus was first described and published in Kew Bull. Vol.70 (Issue 4) in 2015. It was initially monotypic, containing only A. hauthallii. In 2019 A. friesii and A. werdermannii were placed in the genus.

The genus name of Alshehbazia is in honour of Ihsan Ali Al-Shehbaz, Ph.D. (born 1939 in Iraq) is an Iraqi American botanist who works as adjunct professor at University of Missouri-St. Louis and Senior Curator at Missouri Botanical Garden.
