= Crelle's Journal =

Journal für die reine und angewandte Mathematik
- Discipline: Mathematics
- Language: German, English, French
- Edited by: Daniel Huybrechts

Publication details
- History: 1826–present
- Publisher: Walter de Gruyter (Germany)
- Frequency: Monthly
- Impact factor: 1.2 (2023)

Standard abbreviations
- ISO 4: J. Reine Angew. Math.

Indexing
- CODEN: JRMAA8
- ISSN: 0075-4102 (print); 1435-5345 (web)

Links
- Journal homepage

Crelle's Journal, or simply Crelle, is the common name for Journal für die reine und angewandte Mathematik ('Journal for Pure and Applied Mathematics'), a mathematics journal.

== History ==
The journal was founded by August Leopold Crelle (Berlin) in 1826 and edited by him until his death in 1855. It was one of the first major mathematical journals that was not a proceedings of an academy. It has published many notable papers, including works of Niels Henrik Abel, Georg Cantor, Gotthold Eisenstein, Carl Friedrich Gauss and Otto Hesse. It was edited by Carl Wilhelm Borchardt from 1856 to 1880, during which time it was known as Borchardt's Journal. The current editor-in-chief is Daniel Huybrechts (Rheinische Friedrich-Wilhelms-Universität Bonn).

== Past editors ==
- 1826–1856: August Leopold Crelle
- 1856–1880: Carl Wilhelm Borchardt
- 1881–1888: Leopold Kronecker, Karl Weierstrass
- 1889–1892: Leopold Kronecker
- 1892–1902: Lazarus Fuchs
- 1903–1928: Kurt Hensel
- 1929–1933: Kurt Hensel, Helmut Hasse, Ludwig Schlesinger
- 1934–1936: Kurt Hensel, Helmut Hasse
- 1937–1952: Helmut Hasse
- 1952–1977: Helmut Hasse, Hans Rohrbach
- 1977–1980: Helmut Hasse
