= Peter Novopashenny =

Peter Alexeyevich Novopashenny (Russian: Пётр Алексеевич Новопашенный, Pyotr Alexeyevich Nowopashenny; German: Peter Novopaschenny) (18 March 1881 in Russia – October 1950 near Orsha in Belarus) was before and during the World War I, a Russian Marine Officer and who worked as a cryptanalyst during World War II for the German Wehrmacht (OKW/Chi) cipher bureau, working on the Russian desk, deciphering enciphered Soviet communications.

A glacier in Novaya Zemlya, part of the Nordenskiöld Glacier Group, was named after him.

== Career ==
=== Naval career ===
After having attended the Naval Cadet School in 1902, Novopashenny served as a naval officer on several Russian warships, firstly on the monitor Admiral Greig (Russian: Адмирал Грейг) in 1903 and a year later on the battleship Sevastopol. In the Russo-Japanese War (1904-1905), he participated in the battle with the Japanese fleet in part. He fell into Japanese captivity, from which he was dismissed, however, after a short time. Thereafter, he served on other ships, on the gunboat Sivuch. In 1910, he graduated from the Nikolaev Naval Academy in St. Petersburg. Later, from 1913 to 1915, he commanded the icebreaker Vaygach (Russian: Вайгач) during the Arctic Ocean Hydrographic Expedition.

From 1915 during World War I, Novopashenny commanded the modern Novik class destroyer Desna (Russian: Десна). In 1916 he became commander of the destroyer Constantine (Russian: Константин). For his services before and during the war, he was awarded the Imperial Russian Order of Saint Anna (Russian: Орденъ Святой Анны) for service (4th stage on 5 May 1904, 3rd stage on 12 August 1907, 2nd stage 12 November 1915). After the October Revolution, he served briefly in the Soviet Navy, and took in April 1918 under the Centrobalt in the negotiations between the German Navy and the Baltic Fleet in Helsinki in part that in Hangö Agreement culminated.

=== Cryptography career ===
Shortly thereafter, he made a break with his Soviet expectant home and went into exile, first travelling to London and then in 1921 to Germany. In the spring of the same year, Peter Novopashenny became acquainted with the ten year younger German, Wilhelm Fenner, who was born in Saint Petersburg, Russia and who was also fluent in the Russian language. The two immediately hit it off. Novopashenny asked Fenner to help with the planned move to Berlin and confided to him that he successfully worked during the war as director of the Russian cryptanalytic service, breaking the ciphers of the German Baltic Fleet and he intended to provide his experiences to the German General Staff. That same year, he offered a course in cryptology and cryptanalysis to Wilhelm Fenner. Novopashenny worked diligently, often late into the night and after some weeks was successful; the cipher of the current Russian Military Attache was solved by Fenner.

In autumn 1922, Novopashenny and Fenner officially started as employees of the cipher bureau of the Reichswehr. Both stayed employed there for next two decades and continued working through the 1938 founding of the (OKW) High Command of the Wehrmacht, working within the cipher bureau, OKW/Chi. While Wilhelm Fenner eventually became Director (German:Ministerialrat (Min.Rat.)) of the Main Group B, while Peter Novopashenny ran the Russian desk and became a successful cryptanalyst, working on the cryptanalysis of Soviet radio traffic.

== Arrest ==
After the ending of the war, he was arrested by Soviet secret agents in the town of Ringleben in Thuringia in Autumn 1945 and was detained and later interrogated until 1946 in Berlin. He died in 1950, in a camp near the Belarusian city of Orsha.
