= Operation Surgeon =

British post-WWII recruiting of German scientists

Operation Surgeon was a British post-Second World War programme to exploit German aeronautics and deny German technical skills to the Soviet Union.

A list of 1,500 German scientists and technicians was created, with the goal of forcibly removing them from Germany ("whether they like it or not") to lessen the risk of their falling into enemy hands. It was feared that if they remained in Germany, they could enable the Soviet Union to "achieve a long range bomber force superior to any other in the world".

At the operation's inception, many of the scientists had already offered their services to British Commonwealth countries, Sweden, Switzerland, Brazil and South America, and regarded working for the Soviet Union as a last resort, should they be prevented from working in Germany and unable to find employment elsewhere in the west.

Of the scientists relocated from 1946-1947, 100 chose to work for the UK.

British records of the operation were made public in 2006.

== See also ==
- T-Force
- Similar (but separate) attempts to remove German technical information and personnel after the war were:
  - Operation Paperclip - US removal of German rocketry experts and materials.
  - TICOM (cryptography)
  - Operation Alsos (nuclear weapons)
  - Operation Osoaviakhim - a secret Soviet operation under which more than 2,500 former Nazi German specialists were transported from former Nazi Germany to the Soviet Union
