= Otfried Deubner =

German classical archaeologist and diplomat

Otfried Deubner (19 December 1908 in Königsberg, Germany – 16 March 2001) was a German classical archaeologist and diplomat. During World War II, Otfried Deubner worked as a linguist in Pers Z S, the signals intelligence agency of the German Foreign Office (German: Auswärtiges Amt).

== Early life and education ==
Deubner was the son of the classical philologist and religious historian Ludwig Deubner. He attended the Lessing-Gymnasium in Frankfurt am Main and the Berthold-Gymnasium in Freiburg im Breisgau. In Easter 1926 he successfully passed the university-preparatory school-leaving qualification Abitur. Subsequently, he studied for one semester each at the University of Stuttgart and Technical University of Munich, before he studied Classical Archeology, Classical Philology and Ancient History in Freiburg, Heidelberg, Berlin, Koenigsberg and Munich.

== Career ==
On 17 December 1931 he was promoted by the archaeologist and translator Ernst Buschor in Munich. For 1932-1933 he received the travel scholarship of the German Archaeological Institute. From Autumn 1933-1935 he worked as an employee of the excavation of Pergamon in the Asclepeion. From 1935 to 1936 he was employed as an assistant to the Department of Rome of the German Archaeological Institute. From November 1937 to February 1938, he served his military service. From 1 April 1939, he worked as a scientific assistant at the Pergamon Museum in Berlin. From 11 July 1940, he worked as a research assistant in the intelligence and communications department of the Foreign Office.

After the war, he was briefly interned by the Americans, before he taught at the University of Marburg as Deputy Assistant, from 1 November 1945 to 31 March 1949. He received his Habilitation as a professor in classical archeology on 18 December 1946. Since April 1946 he had been active in the Hessian debt service and passed the State exam on 26 July 1946. From May 1949, he was a teacher at the boarding school of Schule Schloss Salem. In 1949, he rejected a call to take the chair for Classical archaeology at the University of Jena.

On 7 December 1950, he was reemployed in the Foreign Office and was initially placed in the headquarters in Bonn. From 1953 until his retirement, on 31 December 1971, he served as cultural adviser in the German agencies in Lisbon, Dublin, Damascus, Bern and at the Holy See. He last lived in Munich.

Deubner was a member of the Archaeological Society of Berlin until 1975.

== Publications ==
- Hellenistische Apollogestalten, Athen 1934 (= Dissertation)
- Das Asklepieion von Pergamon. Kurze vorläufige Beschreibung, Berlin 1938
- Ludwig Deubner: Kleine Schriften zur klassischen Altertumskunde, Herausgegeben und mit einer Bibliographie sowie einem ausführlichen Register versehen von Otfried Deubner, Königstein/Taunus 1982, ISBN 3-445-02250-X
