= Horst Hauthal =

Horst Hauthal (born 3 September 1913 in Berlin; died 21 March 2002 in Bad Neuenahr-Ahrweiler) was a German ambassador. Horst Hauthal was also known for his meteoric rise to lead the cryptographic Section in Z Branch of the Pers Z S, the Foreign Office Personnel Department (German: Sonderdienst des Referats Z in der Personalabteilung des Auswärtigen Amtes) during World War II

== Life ==
Hauthal graduated from high school in Berlin in 1932 and studied mathematics, natural sciences and philosophy in Berlin and Martin Luther University of Halle-Wittenberg in Halle .

Hauthal joined the Nazi Party in 1937 (member number 5,062,619), became a trainee in 1939 and joined the Foreign Office in 1940. Until 1945, Horst Hauthal headed the secretary council, known as a staff special service, as a member of the personnel department, under the direction of the envoy Kurt Selchow. The cryptography department was concerned with the compilation and distribution of codes and ciphers in the Ministry of Foreign Affairs.

In 1954, Hauthal was promoted to Doctor of Economics at the University of Bonn with a thesis titled: An econometric survey on the dependence of employment on pay levels (German:Eine ökonometrische Untersuchung zur Abhängigkeit der Beschäftigung von der Lohnhöhe). In the Department of Foreign Affairs of the Federal Republic of Germany, Hauthal was set up in Unit 114, led by former Pers Z S linguist, cryptanalyst and colleague Director Adolf Paschke (1911-1981). From 1962, Hauthal was accredited as an economic expert at the German University in Cairo. On 4 August 1964 he was promoted to the Legation Council. In 1966 Hauthal was a member of the Legation Council of the German Embassy in Egypt. [5] In 1967, Hauthal was the head of the Department for Economic Relations to the Middle East and North Africa of the Federal Foreign Office.

On 14 September 1971, Hauthal was appointed Head of Unit for Middle East and North Africa, the Department of Trade Policy, Development Policy and European Economic Integration. In 1959 the government of the Federal Republic of Germany concluded an investment protection agreement with the military regime in Pakistan. This was the first Bilateral Investment Treaty (BIT) for Pakistan. Under the leadership of Zulfikar Ali Bhutto, this treaty was ratified in the 1973 Constitution. [8] From 19 to 20 November 1973, Horst Hauthal was the head of the South Asia Department at the Federal Foreign Office, with Lothar Lahn on the fourth bilateral talks in Islamabad. German companies then invested in the fields of energy management, petroleum refining and defense technology.
