= August Leopold Crelle =

German mathematician (1780–1855)

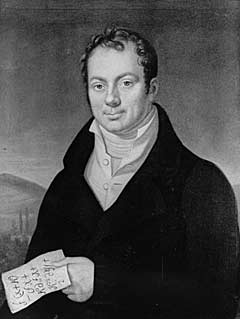
August Leopold Crelle

August Leopold Crelle (17 March 1780 – 6 October 1855) was a German mathematician. He was born in Eichwerder near Wriezen, Brandenburg, and died in Berlin. He is the founder of Journal für die reine und angewandte Mathematik (also known as Crelle's Journal). He befriended Niels Henrik Abel and published seven of Abel's papers in the first volume of his journal.

In 1841, he was elected a foreign member of the Royal Swedish Academy of Sciences. He was elected as a member to the American Philosophical Society in 1853.
