= Petroravenia =

Scientific classification
- Kingdom: Plantae
- Clade: Tracheophytes
- Clade: Angiosperms
- Clade: Eudicots
- Clade: Rosids
- Order: Brassicales
- Family: Brassicaceae
- Genus: Petroravenia; Al-Shehbaz
- Species: P. eseptata

Binomial name
- Petroravenia eseptata Al-Shehbaz

Genus of flowering plants

Petroravenia is a genus of plants in the family Brassicaceae. It includes a single species, Petroavenia eseptata, a perennial native to subalpine areas in Jujuy and Salta provinces of northwestern Argentina.

Petroravenia eseptata is a perennial herb spreading by means of underground rhizomes. All the above-ground vegetative parts are covered with finely branched hairs. Leaves are sessile (without petiolr), ovate to elliptical, up to 4 mm (0.16 inches) long. Petals 4, white, narrow. Fruits are egg-shaped, up to 5 mm (0.1 inches) long, lacking septum, with 8-18 seeds per fruit.

The genus and species were first described in 1994. The genus Petroravenia was named in honor of Peter H. Raven, President Emeritus of the Missouri Botanical Garden in St. Louis. The plants are superficially similar to those of the genus Draba, but differ from them in several technical fruit and seed characters. Most important of these is Petroravenia's lack of septum diving the fruit into two compartments, which is the usual case in the family.
