= William Gottlieb Schauffler =

German missionary

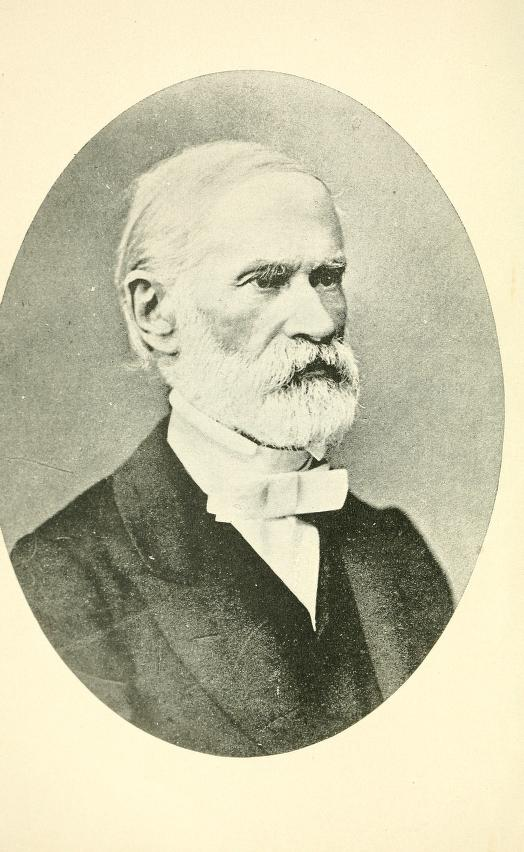
- Born: August 22, 1798; Stuttgart, Germany
- Died: January 27, 1883 (aged 84); New York City, United States
- Burial place: Woodlawn Cemetery Bronx, Bronx County, New York, USA
- Occupation: Missionary
- Spouse: Mary Reynolds (married 1834)
- Children: Children (6): Wilhelm Samuel Schauffler; Jakob Ferdinand Schauffler; Rev Henry Albert Schauffler; Edward William Schauffler; Alfred Theodore Schauffler; Adolph Frederick Schauffler
- Parents: Philip Frederick Schauffler; Caroline Henrietta Schuckart

William Gottlieb Schauffler (August 22, 1798 – January 27, 1883) was a German missionary.

== Biography ==
Schauffler was born in Stuttgart, Germany on August 22, 1798, and died in New York City on January 27, 1883. He emigrated to Odessa, Russia, with his parents and about 400 others, in 1804, and adopted his father's trade, that of a maker of wooden musical instruments. In 1820 the preaching of Ignatius Lindl, a Roman Catholic priest of evangelical views, turned his thoughts toward religion, and he resolved to devote his life to mission work. After serving as an independent missionary in Turkey in 1826, he made his way to the United States, with no property but his clothes, his flute, and one dollar in money, and entered Andover Theological Seminary, where he supported himself for a time by turning wooden bed-posts. He was graduated in 1830, ordained on November 14, 1831, and returned to Turkey under the auspices of the American board.

Schauffler married Mary Reynolds (1802-1895) on the 24th of February, 1834, and resided chiefly in Constantinople during his missionary service of forty-four years, laboring principally among the Jews and Armenians. In 1843 he was instrumental in persuading Sir Stratford Canning, the British minister, to interfere in behalf of members of the latter race that had been persecuted by the Armenian patriarch. For his efforts in behalf of the German colony in Constantinople he received a decoration from the king of Prussia. From 1839 till 1842 he resided in Vienna engaged in translating the Scriptures into Hebrew-Spanish. The work was published in that city in two quarto volumes. He made a visit to this country in 1857-'8, and from 1877, three years after his retirement from active work, resided here till his death. The University of Halle gave him the degree of D. D. in 1867, and Princeton that of LL. D. in 1879. Dr. Schauffler was a scholar of fine attainments, being "able to speak ten languages and read as many more." Besides the work mentioned above, he was the author of a translation of the Bible into Turkish, which received high praise. His English publications include, besides single sermons, "Essay on the Right Use of Property" (Boston, 1832), and "Meditations on the Last Days of Christ" (1837; new eds., 1853 and 1858). See his "Autobiography," edited by his sons, with an introduction by Prof. Edwards A. Park (New York, 1887).
