= Erich Hüttenhain =

- Erich Hüttenhain
- Born: 26 January 1905; Siegen
- Died: 1 December 1990 (aged 85); Brühl
- Education: University of Münster
- Occupation: cryptologist

Erich Hüttenhain (26 January 1905 in Siegen – 1 December 1990 in Brühl) was a German academic mathematician and cryptographer and considered a leading cryptanalyst in the Third Reich. He was Head of the cryptanalysis unit at OKW/Chi, the Cipher Department of the High Command of the Wehrmacht.

== Life ==
Hüttenhain was the son of a conrector and studied after the high school diploma (German: Abitur) 1924 in Siegen at the University of Marburg, the Johann Wolfgang Goethe-University Frankfurt and the University of Münster. He studied mathematics with Heinrich Behnke and astronomy at Münster. There he was assistant to Martin Lindow (1880–1967), who was director of the observatory at Münster. In 1933, at the University of Münster, he took his examination for promotion of Dr. phil. in astronomy under Lindow with the thesis titled: Spatial infinitesimal orbits around the libration points in the straight-line case of the (3 + 1) bodies.

== Military career ==
In 1936, he was sent to the cipher bureau of the OKW OKW/Chi under the director Wilhelm Fenner. Erich Hüttenhain had an interest in Mayan chronology which led him to cryptology and thus to OKW/CHi. As a recruitment test, Fenner had sent him a message which had been enciphered with a private cipher. Hüttenhain duly deciphered it and was accepted as a possible cryptanalyst. At OKW/Chi he was employed as a specialist to build a cryptanalytic research unit, and later he was most recently Executive Council Head of group IV Analytical cryptanalysis.

During his time in OKW/Chi he succeeded, among other things, in the deciphering of the Japanese Purple cipher machine (William Frederick Friedman) He and his staff also temporarily succeeded in deciphering American rotary machines, such as the M 138 A and the M-209 in North Africa. Later in the war, when the allies invaded Italy, the allies learned in turn by deciphering Italian ciphers that their later systems, e.g. among others the SIGABA designed by Friedman, had not been broken and around that time, Hüttenhain had no more major successes.

After World War II, being a high value target, he was taken by TICOM to the USA to be interrogated. For the Americans, he built a machine (which was already used by the Germans during World War II) that deciphered the Russian rotor machine encryption. He also created reports on the successes of the Germans on cryptographic territory during World War II (as deciphering the French naval codes, the Polish diplomat cipher and the security of the Enigma).

== Gehlen organisation ==
After his return he founded in 1947 the "Study Group for Scientific Investigation" (German: Studiengesellschaft für wissenschaftliche Arbeiten) within the Gehlen Organization, which laid the foundation for the subsequent formation of the German Central Office for Encryption (German: Zentralstelle für das Chiffrierwesen) (ZfCh), a unit of the German Federal Intelligence Service (German: Bundesnachrichtendienst). His pseudonym in the Gehlen organization was Erich Hammerschmidt. In the first official cryptographic service of the Federal Government, the Unit 114 in the Foreign Ministry, headed by Adolf Paschke founded in 1950, he was the chair of the Scientific Advisory Board, along with Kurt Selchow, Rudolf Schauffler, and Heinz Kuntze, some of the best cryptologists in Germany. During 1956–1970 he served as Deputy Director of the Central Office for Encryption where initially Wilhelm Göing and 1972 Otto Leiberich was his successor. One of the objectives of Hüttenhain was that in contrast to his experiences in the Third Reich where numerous independent cipher bureaux were spread throughout the Reich, all threads for evaluating cryptographic procedures were now to be integrated into a single office.

In 1926 he was a founding fellow of the Frankfurt Burschenschaft Arminia .

Hüttenhain left a posthumous manuscript he wrote in about 1970 and in which he reports on his experience as a cryptologist.

== Publications ==
- E. Hüttenhain (1933), "Räumliche infinitesimale Bahnen um die Librationspunkte im Geradlinien-Fall der (3+1)-Körper", Astronomische Nachrichten (in German), 250 (18): 297–316, Bibcode:1933AN....250..297H, doi:10.1002/asna.19332501802
- Erich Hüttenhain (1974), Die Geheimschriften des Fürstbistums Münster unter Christoph Bernhard von Galen 1650 – 1678 [The secret codes of the prince-bishopric Münster under Christoph Bernhard von Galen 1650 – 1678], Schriften der Historischen Kommission Westfalens (in German), vol. 9, Münster: Aschendorff Verlag, ISBN 3-402-05609-7
