= Curt Selchow =

German diplomat (1886-?)

Curt Selchow (born 28 May 1886 in Oppeln, Upper Silesia, Germany) was a Minister (German: Gesandter Ministerialdirigent) and Director of the Z Branch, the Signal Intelligence Agency of the German Foreign Office (German: Auswärtiges Amt) before and during World War II.

== Life ==
His father was Hugo Selchow. His wife was Erna Selchow and he had one daughter called Gitta. He was educated in Oppeln until 1906 when he became a soldier. He was initially assigned to the Infantry, then in 1912 he was transferred to Signal Corps (Nachrichten Telegrafen Bataillon) in Frankfurt (Oder).

== Military ==
He served with the German Army of World War I as a signal officer with the troop. Selchow stated that even in the midst of World War I, he pointed out to the Chief Signal Office that much of the work being done in the German Army Signal Corps belonged properly to the German Ministry of Foreign Affairs because of its diplomatic nature. The Chief Signal Officer did not agree with this statement and during World War I much of the work done by the Army was diplomatic in nature. Directly after the war, Selchow entered the Ministry of Foreign Affairs, where he organized the cipher bureau. He brought with him several soldiers who had been with him during World War I. These were Schauffler, Paschke, Zastrow, Brandes, Hoffman and Kunze. He is listed as a Principal Foreign Office Specialist (Vortragender Legationsrat) on 1 November 1935, with the rank of Minister in 1945. In mid-April 1947, Selchow moved to Wedel in Hamburgh. After the war Selchow maintained contact with some of his colleagues. Little is known about his abilities, but statements from personnel in other cipher bureaus imply that he was jealous and secretive. His Pers Z S staff characterized him as a competent administrator who knew little about cryptography and cryptanalysis. Selchow was somewhat of a Europhile and detested the Nazi Party. With the advent of Adolf Hitler in 1933 and Hermann Göring's Forschungsamt cipher bureau encroached upon the field of the Pers Z S, which was the interception and processing of diplomatic ciphers. Selchow at the time fervently wished to resign by was persuaded to stay by von Bülow, who until 1938 was Secretary of the Ministry of Foreign Affairs, when he died. When Joachim von Ribbentrop, the new Foreign Minister, he lost a lot of supervisory power, and was restricted in duties. He was forced to join the Nazi Party in 1941. During World War II, he had no exact knowledge of the messages passed between different parties, and took no part in any matters pertaining to diplomacy. He remained head of the cipher bureau until May 1945.

== After World War II ==
In 1950, the Federal Foreign Office tasked Selchow along with Erich Hüttenhain, Heinz Kunze (1890-1970) and Rudolf Schauffler to form a cryptographic service under the direction of Adolf Paschke that was called Section 114. The service was to act as a cypher bureau for the Central office of Encryption (ZfCh) (German: Zentralstelle für das Chiffrierwesen) that had been previously created in 1947 and was located at Camp King.

In 1955 the unit was disbanded as West Germany was rearming and a new unit was to be created. In 1956, all the equipment and resources of the unit were transferred to the Federal Intelligence Service. In 1989 the unit was renamed ZFI (German: Zentralstelle für Sicherheit in der Informationstechnik). In 1991 it became the BSI (Federal Office for Information Security).
