= TICOM =

Allied project during WWII

TICOM (Target Intelligence Committee) was a secret Allied project formed in World War II to find and seize German intelligence assets, particularly in the field of cryptology and signals intelligence.

It operated alongside other Western Allied efforts to extract German scientific and technological information and personnel during and after the war, including Operation Paperclip (for rocketry), Operation Alsos (for nuclear information) and Operation Surgeon (for avionics).

== History ==
The project was initiated by the British, but when the US Army Chief of Staff General George Marshall learnt of it, it soon became Anglo-American. The aim was to seek out and capture the cryptologic secrets of Germany. The concept was for teams of cryptologic experts, mainly drawn from the code-breaking center at Bletchley Park, to enter Germany with the front-line troops and capture the documents, technology and personnel of the various German signal intelligence organizations before these precious secrets could be destroyed, looted, or captured by the Soviets. There were six such teams.

- Team 1 was tasked to capture German Geheimschreiber (secret writer) machines whose enciphered traffic was code named Fish
- Team 2 was to assist Team 1 with transporting Field Marshal Kesselring's communications train to Britain (the so-called "Jellyfish Convoy")
- Team 3 was to investigate an intact German Signals intelligence unit called "Pers Z S"
- Team 4 was to investigate in more detail the places in southern Germany that the Team 1 search had passed over quickly
- Team 5: Following the serendipitous discovery of a waterproof box containing some of the archives of the Cipher Department of the High Command of the Wehrmacht (OKW/Chi) on the bed of Lake Schliersee, this team was tasked with recovering anything else of value from that lake
- Team 6 aimed to capture and exploit material from the German Naval Intelligence Center and the German SIGINT headquarters

=== OKW/Chi (High Command) ===
The Allied supposition that the Supreme Command of the German Armed Forces, the Oberkommando der Wehrmacht Chiffrierabteilung (abbreviated OKW/Chi) was the German equivalent of Bletchley Park, was found to be incorrect. Despite it being the top SIGINT agency in the German military, it did not set policy. It did not co-ordinate or direct the signal intelligence work of the different services. It concentrated instead on employing the best cryptanalysts to design Germany's own secure communications systems, and to assist the individual services organisations. These were:

- The Army (Heer) OKH/GdNA, the Oberkommando des Heeres/General der Nachrichtenaufklärung
- Air Force (Luftwaffe) Chi Stelle
- Navy (Kriegsmarine) Beobachtungsdienst or B-Dienst
- Foreign Office Pers ZS
- Nazi Party Forschungsamt or FA

Drs Huttenhain and Fricke of OKW/Chi were requested to write about the methods of solution of the German machines. This covered the un-steckered Enigma, the steckered Enigmas; Hagelin B-36 and BC-38; the cipher teleprinters Siemens and Halske T52 a/b, T52/c; the Siemens SFM T43; and the Lorenz SZ 40, SZ42 a/b. They assumed Kerckhoffs's principle that how the machines worked would be known, and addressed only the solving of keys, not the breaking of the machines in the first place. This showed that, at least amongst the cryptographers, the un-steckered Enigma was clearly recognized as solvable. The Enigmas with the plugboard (Steckerbrett) were considered secure if used according to the instructions, but were less secure if stereotyped beginnings or routine phrases were used, or during the period of what they described as the "faulty indicator technique" - used up until May 1940. It was their opinion, however, that the steckered Enigma had never been solved.

=== FA Discovery ===
The discovery in May 1945 of the Nazi Party's top secret FA signals intelligence and cryptanalytic agency at the Kaufbeuren Air Base in southern Bavaria came as a total surprise. The province of Luftwaffe chief Hermann Göring, it has been described as "the richest, most secret, the most Nazi, and the most influential" of all the German cryptanalytic intelligence agencies.

=== Russian "FISH" Discovery ===
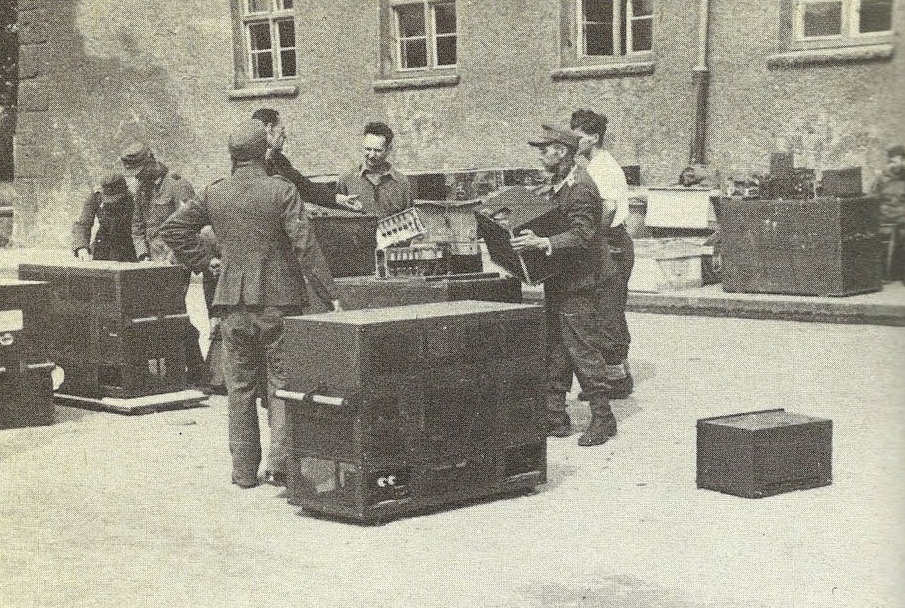
German prisoners prepare the "Russian Fish" for loading and shipment to England, June 1945.

The greatest success for TICOM was the capture of the "Russian Fish", a set of German wide-band receivers used to intercept Soviet high-level radio teletype signals. On May 21, 1945, a party of TICOM Team 1 received tip that a German POW had knowledge of certain signals intelligence equipment and documentation relating Russian traffic. After identifying the remaining members of the unit, they were all taken back to their previous base at Rosenheim. The prisoners recovered about 7 ½ tons of equipment. One of the machines was re-assembled and demonstrated. TICOM officer 1st Lt. Paul Whitaker later reported. "They were intercepting Russian traffic right while we were there…pretty soon they had shown us all we needed to see."

=== Related efforts ===
In Operation Stella Polaris the Finnish signals intelligence unit was evacuated to Sweden following the Finland/Soviet cease-fire in September 1944. The records, including cryptographic material, ended up in the hands of Americans.

== See also ==
- Ralph Tester, senior British codebreaker who worked on the TICOM project
- Operation Claw
