= Aigner =

Aigner is a German surname. Notable people with the surname include:

- Alexander Aigner (1909–1988), number theorist, professor at the Karl Franzens University in Graz, Austria
- Andreas Aigner (born 1984), Austrian rally driver
- Barbara Aigner (born 2005), Austrian para alpine skier
- Chrystian Piotr Aigner (1756–1841), Polish architect
- Clemens Aigner (born 1993), Austrian ski jumper
- Ernst Aigner (born 1966), retired Austrian footballer
- Etienne Aigner (1904–2002), Hungarian-born German fashion designer, and existing Fashion House of same name (Etienne Aigner AG)
- Franz Aigner (footballer) (born 1967), retired Austrian football player and a football manager
- Franz Aigner (weightlifter) (1892–1970), Austrian weightlifter
- Fritz Aigner (1930–2005), Austrian graphic artist and painter
- Gerhard Aigner (1943–2024), General Secretary of UEFA
- Gustava Aigner (1906–1987), Austrian geologist and palaeontologist
- Hannes Aigner, German slalom canoeist
- Hans Dieter Aigner (born 1958), Austrian artist and writer
- Heinrich Aigner (1924–1988), German politician
- Ilse Aigner (born 1964), German politician and member of the Christian Social Union of Bavaria (CSU)
- Inge Aigner (born 1943), Austrian sprinter
- Johannes Aigner (born 1981), Austrian footballer
- Johannes Aigner (alpine skier) (born 2005), Austrian para alpine skier
- Josef Aigner (born 1959), former international speedway rider from West Germany
- Joseph Mathäus Aigner (1818–1886), 19th century Austrian portrait painter
- Korbinian Aigner (1885–1966), Catholic priest and pomologist
- Lucien Aigner (1901–1999), Hungarian photographer and pioneering photojournalist
- Manuela Aigner (born 1973), retired German high jumper
- Markus Aigner (born 1972), German retired footballer
- Martin Aigner (1942–2023), Austrian mathematician
- Nina Aigner (born 1980), Austrian international football player
- Paul Aigner (1905–1984), Austrian marketing designer, portraitist and painter of female nudes
- Rainer Aigner (born 1967), German former footballer
- Rudolf Aigner (1903–1975), Austrian footballer
- Sebastian Aigner (born 2001), Austrian professional footballer
- Stefan Aigner (born 1987), German footballer who plays for Eintracht Frankfurt
- Thomas Aigner (born 1964), former Austrian TV entertainer, documentary film producer and lecturer
- Veronika Aigner (born 2003), Austrian para alpine skier
- Lukas Aigner (born 2007), German aprentice

== See also ==
- Lajos Abafi-Aigner (1840–1909), Hungarian editor, a librarian and entomologist
- Oktavia Aigner-Rollett (1877–1959), Austrian physician
- Eigner
