= Albin Lesky =

Austrian classical philologist (1896–1981)

- Born: 7 July 1896; Graz, Styria, Austria
- Died: 28 February 1981 (aged 84)
- Occupation: Classical philologist
- Spouse: Erna Lesky

Albin Lesky (7 July 1896 – 28 February 1981) was an Austrian classical philologist. He was born in Graz, and was married to Austrian historian of medicine Erna Lesky.

== Early life ==
Lesky was born in Graz, Austria, in 1896, and was educated at the Academic Gymansium of his home town. Having graduated in 1914, he enrolled at the University of Graz in order to study Classics. However, he was drafted into the Austro-Hungarian army after only a single semester. Lesky resumed his studies only after the war.

Lesky received his doctorate in 1920, before passing his teaching examination and a probationary year as a teacher at his former school. Despite holding a teaching role at a school, rather than academic position at a university, Lesky continued his scholarly work and completed his Habilitation in 1924 with a thesis entitled 'Alkestis. Der Mythos und das Drama'. He was appointed an associate professor in Greek studies at Graz in 1930, translated to the University of Vienna in 1932, before he became a full professor in 1936 at the University of Innsbruck. At Innsbruck, he served as Dean in 1937-38, before becoming Prorector in 1942. Lesky's subjects concerned Greek drama, Homer, lyric poetry, lyric, and myth.

== Involvement with National Socialism ==
Albin Lesky, along with his wife Erna Lesky (membership number 7,252,714), applied for membership in the Nazi Party (NSDAP) on the 16th of December, 1939, and was accepted on the 1st of November, 1939 with membership number 7,252,762. Lesky had already been active in the German nationalist and völkisch association Südmark in the 1930s. He participated in 'Aktion Ritterbusch', the deployment of the humanities in Nazi war propaganda, which aimed at selection, deportation, and genocide.

Following the war, Lesky portrayed himself as a victim of National Socialism despite the fact he had remained in office as Prorector of the University of Innsbruck until 1945. Although the Allied occupation forces initially refused to denazify Lesky, following his appearance before a denazification commission he was ruled denazified (categorised as a minderbelastet) in 1946. Having moved from Innsbruck to the University of Vienna, where he was appointed to the Chair in Classical Philology in 1949, Lesky was able to ignore his Nazi party while simultaneously leveraging the networks of former Nazis in order to future his career.

== Later career ==
Lesky dedicated himself to establishing Vienna's Institute of Classical Philology. Thanks to his leadership, it became one of the best equipped institutes of its kind in Europe. In Vienna he served as Dean in 1958-59, Rector 1969-64, and as Vice-Rector in 1965 he gave the keynote speech at the 600th anniversary celebration of the University of Vienna. He was awarded the Rector's Commemorative Medal, and in 1998 he was honoured by the name of one of the 'Gates of Remembrance' on the University of Vienna campus being renamed after him and his wife, Erna Lesky.

== List of works ==
- Strom ohne Brücke. Leykam, Graz 1918.
- Alkestis, der Mythus und das Drama. Hölder-Pichler-Tempsky, Wien 1925.
- Die griechische Tragödie. Kröner, Stuttgart 1938.
- Der Kosmos der Choephoren. Hölder-Pichler-Tempsky, Wien 1943.
- Humanismus als Erbe und Aufgabe. Rauch, Innsbruck 1946.
- Erziehung. Tyrolia, Innsbruck 1946.
- Thalatta. Rohrer, Wien 1947.
- Die Maske des Thamyris. Rohrer, Wien 1951.
- Sophokles und das Humane. Rohrer, Wien 1952.
- Die Homerforschung in der Gegenwart. Sexl, Wien 1952.
- Die Entzifferung von Linear B. Rohrer, Wien 1954.
- Die tragische Dichtung der Hellenen. Vandenhoeck & Ruprecht, Göttingen 1956.
- Geschichte der griechischen Literatur. Francke, Bern 1957; 2. Auflage Bern/München 1963.
- Göttliche und menschliche Motivation im homerischen Epos. Winter, Heidelberg 1961.
- Gesammelte Schriften. Francke, Bern 1966.
- Homeros. Druckenmüller, Stuttgart 1967.
- Herakles und das Ketos. Österreichische Akademie der Wissenschaften, Wien 1967.
- Vom Eros der Hellenen. Vandenhoeck & Ruprecht, Göttingen 1976.
- Epos, Epyllion und Lehrgedicht. In: Ernst Vogt (Hrsg.): Griechische Literatur. Wiesbaden 1981 (= Neues Handbuch der Literaturwissenschaft. Band 2), S. 19–72.
