= Ida Valeton =

German geologist (1922–2016)

- Born: 26 May 1922; Hamburg
- Died: 4 April 2016 (aged 93); Braunschweig
- Awards: Goldenes Sportabzeichen (1977); Ehrenmedaille Portugaleser in Gold (1986)
- Scientific career
- Fields: Geology
- Workplaces: University of Hamburg
- Doctoral advisor: Franz Heritsch

Ida Valeton (born Meggendorfer, 26 May 1922 – 4 April 2016) was a German scientist. She was head of the sediment petrographic lab at the geological and paleontological institute of the University of Hamburg. Additionally, she was visiting professor at several sites.

Her scientific focus was on sediment and bauxite research.

== Life ==
=== Early life ===
Ida Valeton was born in 1922 in Hamburg, as the first daughter of Ina and Friedrich Meggendorfer. In 1935, after her father had been appointed professor of psychiatry at the Friedrich-Alexander University, the family moved to Erlangen. During World War II, she studied in Erlangen, Munich, and Graz.

=== Scientific career ===
After she received her doctorate under the supervision of Franz Heritsch at the University of Graz she began her scientific tenure under the auspices of Carl Wilhelm Correns at the University of Göttingen. From 1948 to 1952 she was the assistant of the geologist Adolf Wurm at the University of Würzburg. Subsequently, she moved to Hamburg with the mandate to establish a laboratory for sediment petrography at the geological state institute of Hamburg (which should later become the geological and paleontological institute of the department of geology at the University of Hamburg). There, she habilitated in 1957 and was appointed the professor in 1964.

In 1963 and 1964 she was visiting professor of the geological institute in Bordeaux. Additional visits abroad lead her to India, Africa, and South America. In summer 1974 she took part in the first expedition of Egon T. Degens to lake Van, where she studied the terrace sediments of the East Anatolian soda lake.

She was an internationally acknowledged expert for bauxite when she retired in 1987.

== Selected publications ==
- Beitrag zur Petrographie des mittleren Muschelkalkes Süddeutschlands. Heidelberger Beiträge zur Mineralogie und Petrographie (1954), Band 4, Ausgabe 1, S. 207-16. doi:10.1007/BF01111157
- Eine vulkanische Tufflage aus der Oberkreide von Hemmoor, Niederelbe. Zeitschrift der Deutschen Geologischen Gesellschaft, Band 111 (1959), S. 739-81
- Facies Problems of Boehmitic and Diasporitic Bauxites. Developments in Sedimentology (1964), Band 2, S. 123-29. doi:10.1016/S0070-4571(08)70535-1
- Faziesprobleme in südfranzosischen Bauxitlagerstätten. Beiträge zur Mineralogie und Petrographie (1965), Band 11, Ausgabe 3, S. 217-46 doi:10.1007/BF01172134
- Bauxites, Elsevier, Amsterdam, 1972. ISBN 0444408886
- I Valeton; A Abdul-Razzak: Glaukonite der Oberkreide Nordwestdeutschlands. 1974
- Lebensraum Alster, Pressestelle der Universität Hamburg, 1975
- Ida Valeton; Abdul Abdul-Razzak; Dietmar Klussmann. Mineralogy and Geochemistry of Glauconite Pellets from Cretaceous Sediments in Northwest Germany. Stuttgart : Schweizerbart'sche Verlagsbuchhandlung, 1982.
- I. Valeton; H. Beissner; A. Carvalho: The tertiary bauxite belt on tectonic uplift areas in the Serra da Mantiqueira, South-East Brazil. Schweizerbart, Stuttgart 1991. ISBN 978-3-510-57017-1
- I. Valeton; F. Wilke: Tertiary bauxites in subsidence areas and associated laterite derived sediments in Northwestern India. Schweizerbart, Stuttgart 1993. ISBN 978-3-510-57018-8
- Gott schenkte mir Flügel. Kovač, Hamburg 2000. ISBN 3830002203

== Additional reference ==
- B. Strübing: Prof. Dr. Ida Valeton – Geologin in: Biographien von Naturwissenschaftlerinnen des Deutschen Akademikerinnen Bundes e.V. ISBN 3-00-007779-0
