= Akademisches Gymnasium =

Akademisches Gymnasium (English: Academic Gymnasium) may refer to:

- Akademisches Gymnasium (Graz), in Austria
- Akademisches Gymnasium Innsbruck, in Austria
- Akademisches Gymnasium (Vienna), in Austria
- Academic Gymnasium Danzig, in Gdańsk, Poland
