= Erna Lesky =

Austrian historian of medicine

Erna Lesky (22 May 1911 – 17 November 1986) was an Austrian pediatrician and historian of medicine. She was the first woman on the medical faculty of the University of Vienna, and was named as "one of the most illustrious medical historians of the twentieth century" by Owen Harding Wangensteen.

== Life ==
Lesky was born on 22 May 1911 in Hartberg. After graduating in 1931 from the Graz Academic Gymnasium, she became a medical student at the University of Vienna, and earned her M.D. in 1936. After continued work studying pediatrics with Richard Priesel, and marriage to philologist Albin Lesky in 1939, she worked as a pediatrician during World War II.

As a young doctor, Lesky took an active part in the League of German Girls (BDM), was a member of the Nazi Party (NSDAP, like her husband Albin Lesky), and from 1940 to 1945 served as the medical director of a mother and child home run by the National Socialist People's Welfare (NSV). She was also an inspector for infant and child welfare in Gau Tyrol-Vorarlberg, an active member of the National Socialist Women's League, the German Women's Labour, and the NSD Physician's League. https://geschichte.univie.ac.at/de/personen/erna-lesky-geb-klingenstein

After the war, she returned to graduate study in history and philology at the University of Vienna. She finished her doctoral dissertation in 1950 and published it in 1951 through the Mainz Academy of Sciences and Literature, but the official date of her promotion was delayed until 1956. She habilitated in medical history in 1957, and in 1960 became head of the university's Neuburger Institute for the History of Medicine, taking up a chair that had been vacant since the end of the war. She was given a permanent position as a reader in 1962, and promoted to full professor in 1966.

She retired as emeritus professor and emeritus director of the institute in 1979, and died on 17 November 1986.

== Contributions ==
Much of Lesky's early work in the Institute for the History of Medicine involved rebuilding the institute, both intellectually and physically, after its deterioration during and after World War II. Although her doctoral research had concerned medicine in ancient Greece, her scholarly work from this period shifted in focus to the history of medicine in Austria. She published her first monographs on this topic in the late 1950s.

In 1960 she translated an English-language work of Johann Peter Frank into German, and was the editor of an autobiography of Carl von Rokitansky; later she also edited Frank's autobiography, and translated a book of selected works of Frank from German into English. She published three monographs on the Viennese Medical School in 1964, 1965, and 1981, the second of which was translated into English in 1976. Another 1970 monograph concerned Czech medical doctor Jan Evangelista Purkyně, and a monograph from 1979 concerned German phrenologist Franz Joseph Gall.

She worked as a de facto editor for the book series Clio Medica beginning in 1964, and served as its official editor from 1970 to 1974.

== Recognition ==
Lesky was elected to the German National Academy of Sciences Leopoldina in 1965. She became a corresponding member of the International Academy of the History of Science in 1967, and a full member in 1976. She served as the academy's secretary-general from 1971 to 1973.

In 1970 she won the Esculape d'Or of the International Society for the History of Medicine. In 1972 she was given a gold medal by the city of Vienna. In 1973 she was elected to the Austrian Academy of Sciences, and in 1976 she was the winner of the Karl Sudhoff Plakette of the German Society for the History of Medicine. The University of Zurich gave her an honorary doctorate in 1978, the first woman to win an honorary doctorate in medicine there based on scholarship rather than humanitarian work. In 1981, she won the William H. Welch Medal of the American Association for the History of Medicine "for significant contributions to the history of medicine", and a festschrift was published in honor of her 70th birthday.

== Books ==
Lesky's books included:

- Die Zeugungs- und Vererbungslehren der Antike und ihr Nachwirken (1951)
- Arbeitsmedizin im 18. Jahrhundert: Werksarzt und Arbeiter im Quecksilberbergwerk Idria (1956)
- Österreichisches Gesundheitswesen im Zeitalter des aufgeklärten Absolutismus (1959)
- Carl von Rokitansky: Selbstbiographie und Antrittsrede (1960)
- Ignaz Philipp Semmelweis und die Wiener Medizinische Schule (1964)
- Die Wiener medizinische Schule im 19. Jahrhundert (1965); translated into English as The Vienna Medical School of the 19th Century (1976)
- Johann Peter Frank: Seine Selbstbiographie (edited, 1969)
- Purkyněs Weg: Wissenschaft, Bildung und Nation (1970)
- Gerard van Swieten und seine Zeit (edited with Adam Wandruszka, 1973)
- Katalog der Josephinischen Bibliothek des Instituts für Geschichte der Medizin in Wien (1974)
- Wien und die Weltmedizin (edited, 1974)
- A System of Complete Medical Police: Selections from Johann Peter Frank (edited, 1976)
- Sozialmedizin: Entwicklung und Selbstverständnis (edited, 1977)
- Franz Joseph Gall (1758–1828): Naturforscher und Anthropologe (1979)
- Meilensteine der Wiener Medizin: Grosse Ärzte Österreichs in drei Jahrhunderten (1981)
