= Paul Aigner =

Austrian graphic designer (1905–1984)

- Born: Paul Stefan Aigner; 23 May 1905; Vienna, Austria
- Died: 19 October 1984 (aged 79); Chieming, Bavaria, Germany
- Known for: Advertisement posters, paintings

Paul Stefan Aigner (23 May 1905 – 19 October 1984) was an Austrian marketing designer, portraitist and painter of female nudes. He is considered to be one of the most important graphic designers of the 1940s and 50s in Austria and Germany.

== Biography ==
Aigner was born in 1905 in Vienna. Because he had no higher education, Aigner was denied admission to various Austrian art schools. He specialized in marketing design in Austria and Germany instead.

== World War II ==
Aigner designed advertisement posters for consumer products and theatrical release posters for the Austrian and German cinema of the 1930s and 40s. Because he believed in apoliticism, Aigner was not a member of the nationalsocialistic artist association that practically ruled the Austrian and German advertisement markets of that time. He lost almost all his contracts when he refused to join the NSDAP (political party).

In 1943, during World War II, Aigner was drafted for the Eastern Front and fought with Grenadier-Regiment 51 of the Wehrmacht against the advancing Red Army. In 1944, while pulling an injured soldier from the line of fire, he got shot and was taken prisoner. He spent the next three years at an unknown Soviet POW camp. There he painted portraits for prison guards and officers, received extra rations in return and shared those rations with other prisoners.

== Art career ==
After his release in 1947, Aigner worked for the tourism industry of Austria. His "Winter sports in Austria" posters were criticised by the Austrian arts establishment for a too realistic and modernized style. His work resembled American commercial graphics of that time period and, the Austrian and German public loved Aigner's designs. He received a commercial arts award by Austrian president Karl Renner.

During the 1950s and 60s, Aigner designed advertisement posters for Austrian and German movies, political parties and consumer products. He designed erotic illustrations for German newspapapers, magazines and books. In 1951, an advertisement poster for tights caused a huge controversy when it was deemed too sexual and got banned by the youth protection agency of Vienna. During the 1960s, when commercial graphic design was replaced by cheaper photography, Aigner experimented with different painting techniques and started painting with oil colors.

In 1977, a few years before his death, Aigner created his single mass-produced offset-lithograph “Weibliche Schoenheit“ (German: “Weibliche Schönheit“, translated: “Female Beauty“), with 500 colored copies and 5 single-colored cyan prints (1005 mm × 515 mm / 39.56 inches x 20.28 inches). He stated that, during his time as a prisoner of the Red Army, the memory of a woman he once knew gave him the strength to keep on going and, later, to process his experience of torture and suffrage. He used this printing technique for one single time to share that woman's spirit. Aigner never revealed who that woman was to him.

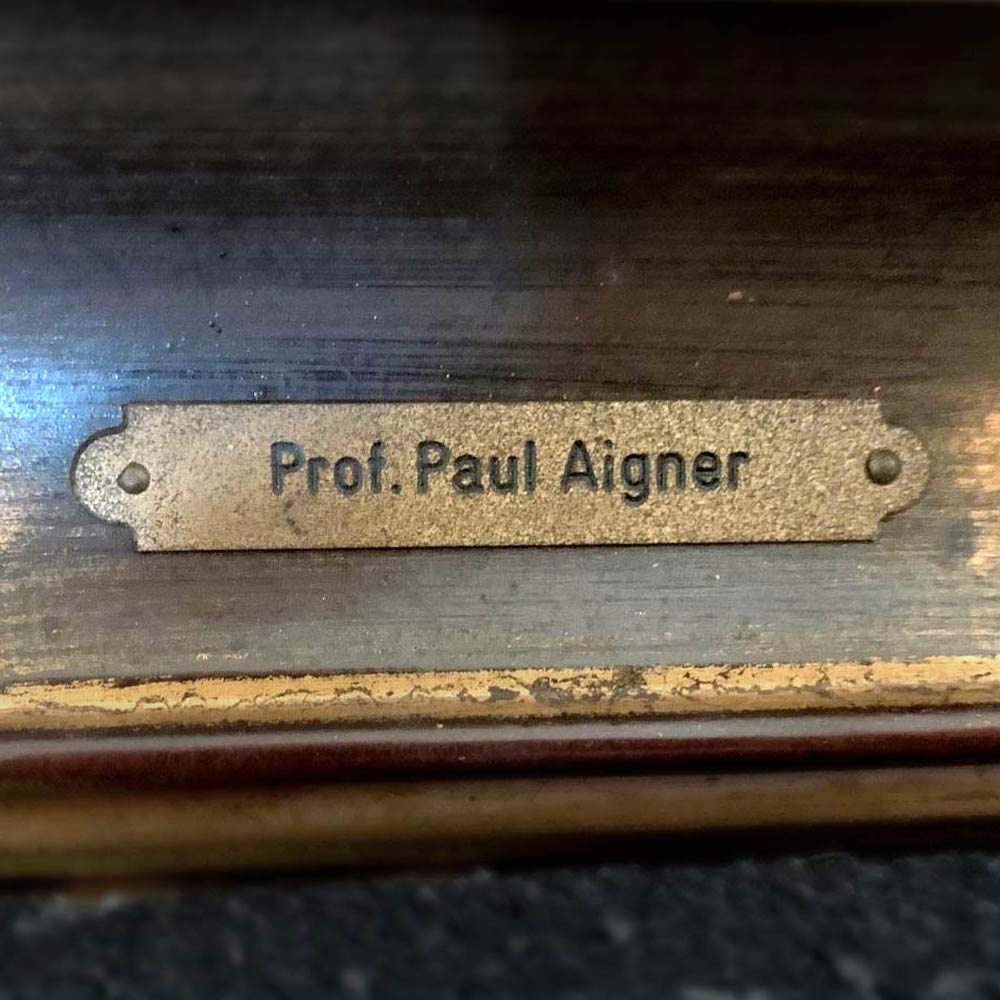
Prof. Paul Aigner plate on a frame

Until his death, Aigner painted landscapes and commissioned portraits. He used a customized picture frame with an engraved plate "Prof. Paul Aigner". Aigner saw this as a marketing gag and a form of disrespect for the cultural elite of Austria. He never held an academic title.

== Death & legacy ==
Paul Aigner died from lung cancer. He was buried in his adopted hometown of Chieming, Bavaria, near Chiemsee lake. He is viewed as a modern graphic designer ahead of his time and a rebel against academic culture in Austria. His multi-category work is conserved at the Austrian National Library in Vienna.
