= Eigner =

Eigner is a surname. Notable people with the surname include:

- Andreas Eigner (1801–1870), German painter
- Christian Eigner (born 1971), Austrian musician
- Ignaz Eigner (1854–1922), Austrian lithographer and painter
- Larry Eigner (1927–1996), American poet
- Ty Eigner (born 1968), American ice hockey coach
