= Combat stress reaction =

Behavioral disorder due to war trauma

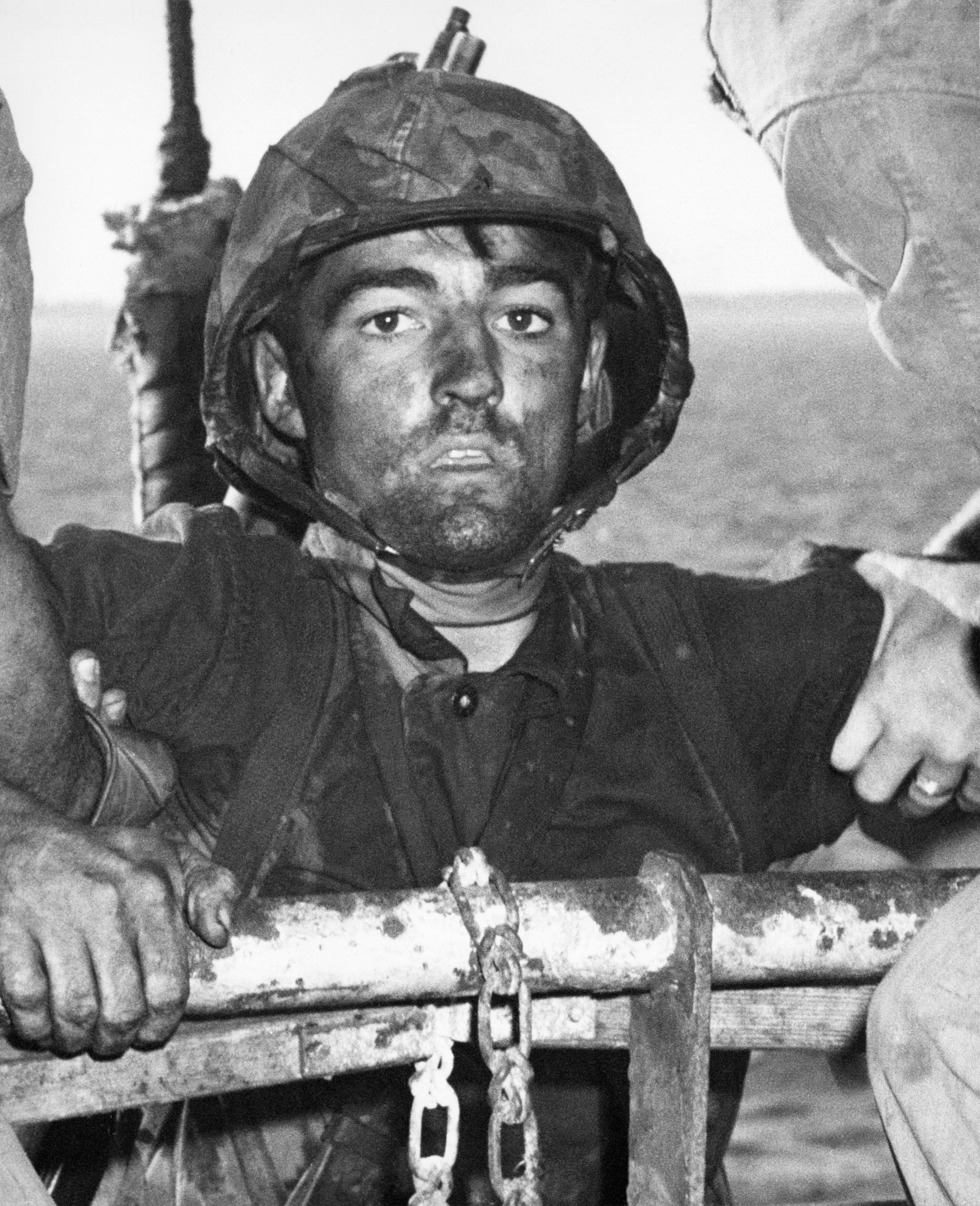
- A U.S. Marine exhibits a "thousand-yard stare" during the Battle of Eniwetok of World War II: an unfocused, despondent and weary gaze which is a frequent manifestation of "combat fatigue".
- Specialty: Psychiatry

Combat stress reaction (CSR) or combat neurosis is acute behavioral disorganization as a direct result of the trauma of war. Also known as "combat fatigue", "battle fatigue", "operational exhaustion", or "battle/war neurosis", it has some overlap with the diagnosis of acute stress reaction used in civilian psychiatry. It is historically linked to shell shock and is sometimes a precursor to post-traumatic stress disorder.

Combat stress reaction is an acute reaction that includes a range of behaviors resulting from the stress of battle that decrease the combatant's fighting efficiency. The most common symptoms are fatigue, slower reaction times, indecision, disconnection from one's surroundings, and the inability to prioritize. Combat stress reaction is generally short-term and should not be confused with acute stress disorder, post-traumatic stress disorder, or other long-term disorders attributable to combat stress, although any of these may commence as a combat stress reaction. The US Army uses the term/initialism COSR (combat stress reaction) in official medical reports. This term can be applied to any stress reaction in the military unit environment. Many reactions look like symptoms of mental illness (such as panic, extreme anxiety, depression, and hallucinations), but they are only transient reactions to the traumatic stress of combat and the cumulative stresses of military operations.

In World War I, shell shock was considered a psychiatric illness resulting from injury to the nerves during combat. The nature of trench warfare meant that about 10% of the fighting soldiers were killed (compared to 4.5% during World War II) and the total proportion of troops who became casualties (killed or wounded) was about 57%. Whether a person with shell-shock was considered "wounded" or "sick" depended on the circumstances. If a soldier received shell shock from encountering the enemy, they were labeled "W" for wounded, but if not, then they were merely assigned "S" for sick. Soldiers were personally faulted for their mental breakdown rather than their war experience. The large proportion of World War I veterans in the European population meant that the symptoms were common to the culture.

In World War II it was determined by the US Army that the time it took for a soldier to experience combat fatigue while fighting on the front lines was somewhere between 60 and 240 days, depending on the intensity and frequency of combat. What had been known in previous wars as "nostalgia", "old sergeant's disease", and "shell shock", became known as "combat fatigue".

== Signs and symptoms ==
Combat stress reaction symptoms align with the symptoms also found in psychological trauma, which is closely related to post-traumatic stress disorder (PTSD). CSR differs from PTSD (among other things) in that a PTSD diagnosis requires a duration of symptoms over one month, which CSR does not.

=== Fatigue-related symptoms ===
The most common stress reactions include:

- The slowing of reaction time
- Slowness of thought
- Difficulty prioritizing tasks
- Difficulty initiating routine tasks
- Preoccupation with minor issues and familiar tasks
- Indecision and lack of concentration
- Loss of initiative with fatigue
- Exhaustion

=== Autonomic nervous system – autonomic arousal ===
- Headaches
- Back pains
- Inability to relax
- Shaking and tremors
- Sweating
- Nausea and vomiting
- Loss of appetite
- Abdominal distress
- Frequency of urination
- Urinary incontinence
- Heart palpitations
- Hyperventilation
- Dizziness
- Insomnia
- Nightmares
- Restless sleep
- Excessive sleep
- Excessive startle
- Hypervigilance
- Heightened sense of threat
- Anxiety
- Irritability
- Depression
- Substance abuse
- Loss of adaptability
- Attempted suicides
- Disruptive behavior
- Mistrust of others
- Confusion
- Extreme feeling of losing control

==== Battle casualty rates ====
The ratio of stress casualties to battle casualties varies with the intensity of the fighting. With intense fighting, it can be as high as 1:1. In low-level conflicts, it can drop to 1:10 (or less). Modern warfare embodies the principles of continuous operations with an expectation of higher combat stress casualties.

The World War II European Army rate of stress casualties of 1 in 10 (101:1,000) troops per annum is skewed downward from both its norm and peak by data by low rates during the last years of the war.

== Diagnosis ==
The following PIE principles were in place for the "not yet diagnosed nervous" (NYDN) cases:

- Proximity – treat the casualties close to the front and within sound of the fighting.
- Immediacy – treat them without delay and not wait until the wounded were all dealt with.
- Expectancy – ensure that everyone had the expectation of their return to the front after a rest and replenishment.

United States medical officer Thomas W. Salmon is often quoted as the originator of these PIE principles. However, his real strength came from going to Europe and learning from the Allies and then instituting the lessons. By the end of the war, Salmon had set up a complete system of units and procedures that was then the "world's best practice". After the war, he maintained his efforts in educating society and the military. He was awarded the Distinguished Service Medal for his contributions.

Effectiveness of the PIE approach has not been confirmed by studies of CSR, and there is some evidence that it is not effective in preventing PTSD.

US services now use the more recently developed BICEPS principles:

- Brevity
- Immediacy
- Centrality or contact
- Expectancy
- Proximity
- Simplicity

=== Between the wars ===
The British government produced a Report of the War Office Committee of Inquiry into "Shell-Shock", which was published in 1922. Recommendations from this included:

In forward areas
No soldier should be allowed to think that loss of nervous or mental control provides an honorable avenue of escape from the battlefield, and every endeavor should be made to prevent slight cases leaving the battalion or divisional area, where treatment should be confined to provision of rest and comfort for those who need it and to heartening them for return to the front line.
In neurological centers
When cases are sufficiently severe to necessitate more scientific and elaborate treatment they should be sent to special Neurological Centers as near the front as possible, to be under the care of an expert in nervous disorders. No such case should, however, be so labelled on evacuation as to fix the idea of nervous breakdown in the patient's mind.
In base hospitals
When evacuation to the base hospital is necessary, cases should be treated in a separate hospital or separate sections of a hospital, and not with the ordinary sick and wounded patients. Only in exceptional circumstances should cases be sent to the United Kingdom, as, for instance, men likely to be unfit for further service of any kind with the forces in the field. This policy should be widely known throughout the Force.
Forms of treatment
The establishment of an atmosphere of cure is the basis of all successful treatment, the personality of the physician is, therefore, of the greatest importance. While recognizing that each individual case of war neurosis must be treated on its merits, the Committee are of opinion that good results will be obtained in the majority by the simplest forms of psycho-therapy, i.e., explanation, persuasion and suggestion, aided by such physical methods as baths, electricity and massage. Rest of mind and body is essential in all cases.

The committee are of opinion that the production of deep hypnotic sleep, while beneficial as a means of conveying suggestions or eliciting forgotten experiences are useful in selected cases, but in the majority they are unnecessary and may even aggravate the symptoms for a time.
They do not recommend psycho-analysis in the Freudian sense.

In the state of convalescence, re-education and suitable occupation of an interesting nature are of great importance. If the patient is unfit for further military service, it is considered that every endeavor should be made to obtain for him suitable employment on his return to active life.
Return to the fighting line
Soldiers should not be returned to the fighting line under the following conditions:

(1) If the symptoms of neurosis are of such a character that the soldier cannot be treated overseas with a view to subsequent useful employment.
(2) If the breakdown is of such severity as to necessitate a long period of rest and treatment in the United Kingdom.
(3) If the disability is anxiety neurosis of a severe type.
(4) If the disability is a mental breakdown or psychosis requiring treatment in a mental hospital.
It is, however, considered that many of such cases could, after recovery, be usefully employed in some form of auxiliary military duty.

Part of the concern was that many British veterans were receiving pensions and had long-term disabilities.

By 1939, some 120,000 British ex-servicemen had received final awards for primary psychiatric disability or were still drawing pensions – about 15% of all pensioned disabilities – and another 44,000 or so were getting pensions for 'soldier's heart' or effort syndrome. There is, though, much that statistics do not show, because in terms of psychiatric effects, pensioners were just the tip of a huge iceberg."

War correspondent Philip Gibbs wrote:

Something was wrong. They put on civilian clothes again and looked to their mothers and wives very much like the young men who had gone to business in the peaceful days before August 1914. But they had not come back the same men. Something had altered in them. They were subject to sudden moods, and queer tempers, fits of profound depression alternating with a restless desire for pleasure. Many were easily moved to passion where they lost control of themselves, many were bitter in their speech, violent in opinion, frightening.

One British writer between the wars wrote:

There should be no excuse given for the establishment of a belief that a functional nervous disability constitutes a right to compensation. This is hard saying. It may seem cruel that those whose sufferings are real, whose illness has been brought on by enemy action and very likely in the course of patriotic service, should be treated with such apparent callousness. But there can be no doubt that in an overwhelming proportion of cases, these patients succumb to 'shock' because they get something out of it. To give them this reward is not ultimately a benefit to them because it encourages the weaker tendencies in their character. The nation cannot call on its citizens for courage and sacrifice and, at the same time, state by implication that an unconscious cowardice or an unconscious dishonesty will be rewarded.

=== World War II ===
==== American ====
At the outbreak of World War II, most in the United States military had forgotten the treatment lessons of World War I. Screening of applicants was initially rigorous, but experience eventually showed it to lack great predictive power.

The US entered the war in December 1941. Only in November 1943 was a psychiatrist added to the table of organization of each division, and this policy was not implemented in the Mediterranean Theater of Operations until March 1944. By 1943, the US Army was using the term "exhaustion" as the initial diagnosis of psychiatric cases, and the general principles of military psychiatry were being used. General Patton's slapping incident was in part the spur to institute forward treatment for the Italian invasion of September 1943. The importance of unit cohesion and membership of a group as a protective factor emerged.

John Appel found that the average American infantryman in Italy was "worn out" in 200 to 240 days and concluded that the American soldier "fights for his buddies or because his self respect won't let him quit". After several months in combat, the soldier lacked reasons to continue to fight because he had proven his bravery in battle and was no longer with most of the fellow soldiers he trained with. Appel helped implement a 180-day limit for soldiers in active combat and suggested that the war be made more meaningful, emphasizing their enemies' plans to conquer the United States, encouraging soldiers to fight to prevent what they had seen happen in other countries happen to their families. Other psychiatrists believed that letters from home discouraged soldiers by increasing nostalgia and needlessly mentioning problems soldiers could not solve. William Menninger said after the war, "It might have been wise to have had a nation-wide educational course in letter writing to soldiers", and Edward Strecker criticized "moms" (as opposed to mothers) who, after failing to "wean" their sons, damaged morale through letters.

Airmen flew far more often in the Southwest Pacific than in Europe, and although rest time in Australia was scheduled, there was no fixed number of missions that would produce transfer out of combat, as was the case in Europe. Coupled with the monotonous, hot, sickly environment, the result was bad morale that jaded veterans quickly passed along to newcomers. After a few months, epidemics of combat fatigue would drastically reduce the efficiency of units. Flight surgeons reported that the men who had been at jungle airfields longest were in bad shape:

Many have chronic dysentery or other disease, and almost all show chronic fatigue states. ... They appear listless, unkempt, careless, and apathetic with almost mask-like facial expression. Speech is slow, thought content is poor, they complain of chronic headaches, insomnia, memory defect, feel forgotten, worry about themselves, are afraid of new assignments, have no sense of responsibility, and are hopeless about the future.

==== British ====
Unlike the Americans, the British leaders firmly held the lessons of World War I. It was estimated that aerial bombardment would kill up to 35,000 a day, but the Blitz killed only 40,000 in total. The expected torrent of civilian mental breakdown did not occur. The Government turned to World War I doctors for advice on those who did have problems. The PIE principles were generally used. However, in the British Army, since most of the World War I doctors were too old for the job, young, analytically trained psychiatrists were employed. Army doctors "appeared to have no conception of breakdown in war and its treatment, though many of them had served in the 1914–1918 war." The first Middle East Force psychiatric hospital was set up in 1942. With D-Day for the first month there was a policy of holding casualties for only 48 hours before they were sent back over the Channel. This went firmly against the expectancy principle of PIE.

Appel believed that British soldiers were able to continue to fight almost twice as long as their American counterparts because the British had better rotation schedules and because they, unlike the Americans, "fight for survival" – for the British soldiers, the threat from the Axis powers was much more real, given Britain's proximity to mainland Europe, and the fact that Germany was concurrently conducting air raids and bombarding British industrial cities. Like the Americans, British doctors believed that letters from home often needlessly damaged soldiers' morale.

==== Canadian ====
The Canadian Army recognized combat stress reaction as "Battle Exhaustion" during the Second World War and classified it as a separate type of combat wound. Historian Terry Copp has written extensively on the subject. In Normandy, "The infantry units engaged in the battle also experienced a rapid rise in the number of battle exhaustion cases with several hundred men evacuated due to the stress of combat. Regimental Medical Officers were learning that neither elaborate selection methods nor extensive training could prevent a considerable number of combat soldiers from breaking down."

==== Germans ====
In his history of the pre-Nazi Freikorps paramilitary organizations, Vanguard of Nazism, historian Robert G. L. Waite describes some of the emotional effects of World War I on German troops, and refers to a phrase he attributes to Göring: men who could not become "de-brutalized".

In an interview, Dr Rudolf Brickenstein stated that:

... he believed that there were no important problems due to stress breakdown since it was prevented by the high quality of leadership. But, he added, that if a soldier did break down and could not continue fighting, it was a leadership problem, not one for medical personnel or psychiatrists. Breakdown (he said) usually took the form of unwillingness to fight or cowardice.

However, as World War II progressed there was a profound rise in stress casualties from 1% of hospitalizations in 1935 to 6% in 1942. Another German psychiatrist reported after the war that during the last two years, about a third of all hospitalizations at Ensen were due to war neurosis. It is probable that there was both less of a true problem and less perception of a problem.

==== Finns ====
The Finnish attitudes to "war neurosis" were especially tough. Psychiatrist Harry Federley, who was the head of the Military Medicine, considered shell shock as a sign of weak character and lack of moral fibre. His treatment for war neurosis was simple: the patients were to be bullied and harassed until they returned to front line service.

Earlier, during the Winter War, several Finnish machine gun operators on the Karelian Isthmus theatre became mentally unstable after repelling several unsuccessful Soviet human wave assaults on fortified Finnish positions.

=== Post-World War II developments ===
Simplicity was added to the PIE principles by the Israelis: in their view, treatment should be brief, supportive, and could be provided by those without sophisticated training.

==== Peacekeeping stresses ====
Peacekeeping provides its own stresses because its emphasis on rules of engagement contains the roles for which soldiers are trained. Causes include witnessing or experiencing the following:

- Constant tension and threat of conflict.
- Threat of land mines and booby traps.
- Close contact with severely injured and dead people.
- Deliberate maltreatment and atrocities, possibly involving civilians.
- Cultural issues.
- Separation and home issues.
- Risk of disease including HIV.
- Threat of exposure to toxic agents.
- Mission problems.
- Return to service.

== Pathophysiology ==
=== SNS activation ===
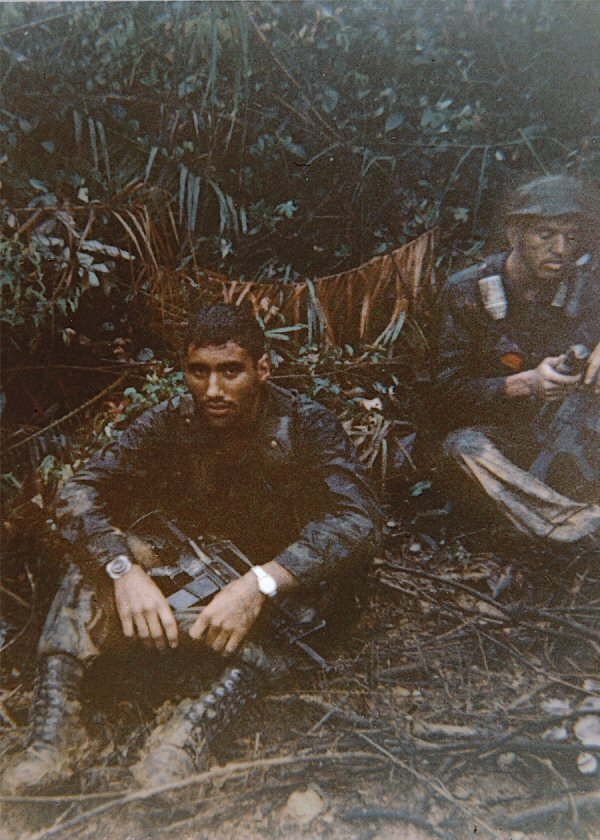
A U.S. Long Range Reconnaissance Patrol leader in Vietnam, 1968.

Many of the symptoms initially experienced by people with CSR are effects of an extended activation of the human body's fight-or-flight response. The fight-or-flight response involves a general sympathetic nervous system discharge in reaction to a perceived stressor and prepares the body to fight or run from the threat causing the stress. Catecholamine hormones, such as adrenaline or noradrenaline, facilitate immediate physical reactions associated with a preparation for violent muscular action. Although the flight-or-fight-response normally ends with the removal of the threat, the constant mortal danger in combat zones likewise constantly and acutely stresses soldiers.

=== General adaptation syndrome ===
The process whereby the human body responds to extended stress is known as general adaptation syndrome (GAS). After the initial fight-or-flight response, the body becomes more resistant to stress in an attempt to dampen the sympathetic nervous response and return to homeostasis. During this period of resistance, physical and mental symptoms of CSR may be drastically reduced as the body attempts to cope with the stress. Long combat involvement, however, may keep the body from homeostasis and thereby deplete its resources and render it unable to normally function, sending it into the third stage of GAS: exhaustion. Sympathetic nervous activation remains in the exhaustion phase and reactions to stress are markedly sensitized as fight-or-flight symptoms return. If the body remains in a state of stress, then much more severe symptoms of CSR as cardiovascular and digestive involvement may present themselves. Extended exhaustion can permanently damage the body.

== Treatment ==
=== 7 Rs ===
The British Army treated Operational Stress Reaction according to the 7 Rs:

- Recognition – identify that the individual has an Operational Stress Reaction
- Respite – provide a short period of relief from the front line
- Rest – allow rest and recovery
- Recall – give the individual the chance to recall and discuss the experiences that have led to the reaction
- Reassurance – inform them that their reaction is normal and they will recover
- Rehabilitation – improve the physical and mental health of the patient until they no longer show symptoms
- Return – allow the soldier to return to their unit

=== Predeployment preparation ===
==== Screening ====
Historically, screening programs that have attempted to preclude soldiers exhibiting personality traits thought to predispose them to CSR have been a total failure. Part of this failure stems from the inability to base CSR morbidity on one or two personality traits. Full psychological work-ups are expensive and inconclusive, while pen and paper tests are ineffective and easily faked. In addition, studies conducted following WWII screening programs showed that psychological disorders present during military training did not accurately predict stress disorders during combat.

==== Cohesion ====
While it is difficult to measure the effectiveness of such a subjective term, soldiers who reported in a WWII study that they had a "higher than average" sense of camaraderie and pride in their unit were more likely to report themselves ready for combat and less likely to develop CSR or other stress disorders. Soldiers with a "lower than average" sense of cohesion with their unit were more susceptible to stress illness.

==== Training ====
Stress exposure training or SET is a common component of most modern military training. There are three steps to an effective stress exposure program.

- Providing knowledge of the stress environment

Soldiers with a knowledge of both the emotional and physical signs and symptoms of CSR are much less likely to have a critical event that reduces them below fighting capability. Instrumental information, such as breathing exercises that can reduce stress and suggestions not to look at the faces of enemy dead, is also effective at reducing the chance of a breakdown.

- Skills acquisition

Cognitive control strategies can be taught to soldiers to help them recognize stressful and situationally detrimental thoughts and repress those thoughts in combat situations. Such skills have been shown to reduce anxiety and improve task performance.

- Confidence building through application and practice

Soldiers who feel confident in their own abilities and those of their squad are far less likely to develop combat stress reaction. Training in stressful conditions that mimic those of an actual combat situation builds confidence in the abilities of themselves and the squad. As this training can actually induce some of the stress symptoms it seeks to prevent, stress levels should be increased incrementally as to allow the soldiers time to adapt.

Narcosynthesis

A technique that was used to treat PTSD disorders during World War II by using sodium pentothal was created by psychiatrists Roy Grinker and John Spiegel. During the treatment, they offered soldiers an opportunity to abreact their trauma by re-experiencing it in a hospital environment in the presence of supportive, protective, and understanding therapists. The therapists induced a dream state or twilight sleep by injecting sodium pentothal, after which most soldiers spontaneously started to express their anxiety. While the psychiatrist fulfilled the soldier's need for protection, the soldier's ego was nurtured, and the soldier was encouraged to abreact his trauma.

== Prognosis ==
Figures from the 1982 Lebanon war showed that with proximal treatment, 90% of CSR casualties returned to their unit, usually within 72 hours. With rearward treatment, only 40% returned to their unit. It was also found that treatment efficacy went up with the application of a variety of front line treatment principles versus just one treatment. In Korea, similar statistics were seen, with 85% of US battle fatigue casualties returned to duty within three days and 10% returned to limited duties after several weeks.

Though these numbers seem to promote the claims that proximal PIE or BICEPS treatment is generally effective at reducing the effects of combat stress reaction, other data suggests that long term PTSD effects may result from the hasty return of affected individuals to combat. Both PIE and BICEPS are meant to return as many soldiers as possible to combat, and may actually have adverse effects on the long-term health of service members who are rapidly returned to the front-line after combat stress control treatment. Although the PIE principles were used extensively in the Vietnam War, the post traumatic stress disorder lifetime rate for Vietnam veterans was 30% in a 1989 US study and 21% in a 1996 Australian study. In a study of Israeli Veterans of the 1973 Yom Kippur War, 37% of veterans diagnosed with CSR during combat were later diagnosed with PTSD, compared with 14% of control veterans.

== Controversy ==
There is significant controversy with the PIE and BICEPS principles. Throughout a number of wars, but notably during the Vietnam War, there has been a conflict among doctors about sending distressed soldiers back to combat. During the Vietnam War this reached a peak with much discussion about the ethics of this process. Proponents of the PIE and BICEPS principles argue that it leads to a reduction of long-term disability but opponents argue that combat stress reactions lead to long-term problems such as post-traumatic stress disorder.

The use of psychiatric drugs to treat people with CSR has also attracted criticism, as some military psychiatrists have come to question the efficacy of such drugs on the long-term health of veterans. Concerns have been expressed as to the effect of pharmaceutical treatment on an already elevated substance abuse rate among former people with CSR.

Recent research has caused an increasing number of scientists to believe that there may be a physical (i.e., neurocerebral damage) rather than psychological basis for blast trauma. As traumatic brain injury and combat stress reaction have very different causes yet result in similar neurologic symptoms, researchers emphasize the need for greater diagnostic care.

== See also ==
- Acute stress disorder
- Eye movement desensitization and reprocessing
- Lack of Moral Fibre
- Shell shock
- Social alienation – among returning war veterans
- Dulce bellum inexpertis
- Franklyn – a film written and directed by Gerald McMorrow that subtly addresses the subject
- Man Down – a film by Dito Montiel that subtly addresses the subject
