= Gustava Aigner =

Austrian geologist and paleontologist (1906–1987)

Gustava Kahler nee Aigner
- Born: Hollis Dow Hedberg; 29 April 1906; Salzburg
- Died: 22 March 1987 (aged 80)
- Spouse: Franz Kahler
- Children: 3 daughters

Gustava Kahler, née Aigner, (29 April 1906 – 22 March 1987) was an Austrian geologist and palaeontologist. She was noted in particular for her work with Franz Heritsch and with her husband, Franz Kahler. In recognition of her discovery of graptolites in the northern greywacke zone, her former fellow student, Ida Peltzmann, named two species for her.

== Life and career ==
Gustava Aigner was born on 29 April 1906 in Salzburg. Her parents were Gustav Aigner, a lawyer, and Maria, née Melbler. She was educated at the Mädchen-Reform-Realgymnasium and then studied geology, paleontology, mineralogy and petrography at the University of Graz. She was only the second woman to study geology at an Austrian university. She earned her PhD in July 1929, when she was only 23 years old, with a dissertation entitled "Die Productiden des Karbons von Nötsch im Gailtal". Her dissertation was the first to reflect a redirection of study in the field away from mineralogy and crystallography and towards stratigraphy and palaeontology.

She then taught for five years at the Realgymnasium for girls in Salzburg. She had originally planned to study botany; her interest in geology was sparked by Franz Heritsch, and in 1935 she married the banker Franz Kahler, a fellow geology student of Heritsch's who had completed his doctorate in 1931. Kahler worked as a geologist in Klagenfurt, in Norway and finally in Carinthia, where he was appointed state geologist in 1947. She co-authored many papers both with Heritsch and with her husband, whom she assisted in a systematic study of the Fusulinida. Their study and publications covered the Late Palaeozoic stratigraphy of the Carnic Alps. In 1937, Aigner and Kahler subdivided the genus Pseudoschwagerina into five subgroups; they then proposed a subgeneric name, Zellia for one of the groups. After the end of World War II in 1945, she and her husband restarted their career and established links with the world.

In June 1979, the University of Graz ceremonially renewed her doctorate and she was presented the Badge of Honour by the Association of academics. In June 1980, the Verband der Akademikerinnen (Association of Women Scholars) honoured her. In recognition of her having made the first discovery of graptolites in the northern Greywacke zone, her former fellow student, Ida Peltzmann, named two species for her.

Gustava Kahler-Aigner had three daughters; her first daughter was born in 1937. She underwent three serious operations and died on 22 March 1987 after a long illness.

== Selected publications ==
- (1929) With Franz Heritsch. "Cephalopoden aus dem Unterkarbon von Nötsch im Gailtal". Mitteilungen der Naturwissenschaftlicher Verein für Steiermark, pp. 43–50 (in German)
- (1930) "Silurische Versteinerungen aus der Grauwackenzone bei Fieberbrunn", Verhandlungen der Geologischen Bundes-Anstalt, pp. 222–24 (in German)
- (1931) With Franz Heritsch. "Das Genus Isogramma im Carbon der Südalpen". Österreichische Akademie der Wissenschaften. Mathematisch-Naturwissenschaftliche Klasse, Denkschriften 102 pp. 303–16 OCLC 25306603 (in German)
- (1937) With Franz Heritsch. "Beitrage zur Kenntnis der Fusuliniden der Ostalpen": Die Pseudoschwagerinen der Grenzlandbanke und des oberen Schwagerinenkalkes. Paleontographica 87(1-2): 1-44. pls. 1–3. (in German)
- (1937) With Franz Heritsch. "Uber das Wirken der Klagenfurter Münze als Montanbank des Kärntner Edelmetallbergbaus" im 16. Jahrhundert. In: ZBHSW, Bd. 85, S. 334–337. (in German)
