= Oktavia Aigner-Rollett =

Physician from Austria

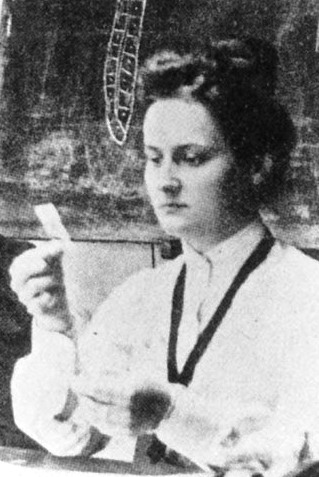
- Oktavia Rollett in 1905
- Born: Oktavia Auguste Rollett; 23 May 1877; Graz, Austria
- Died: 22 May 1959 (aged 81); Graz, Austria
- Education: Akademisches Gymnasium (Graz); University of Graz
- Occupation: Doctor
- Spouse: Walter Aigner (m. 1908)
- Father: Alexander Rollett
- Relatives: Edwin Rollett (sister); Alexander Aigner (son); Adalbert Aigner (son)

Oktavia Aigner-Rollett (née Oktavia Auguste Rollett; 23 May 1877, Graz — 22 May 1959, Ibid.) was an Austrian physician. She was one of the first women to receive a doctorate from the University of Graz, and was the first female doctor to work at the General Hospital.

== Life ==
Oktavia Rollett was born on 23 May 1877 in Graz, Styria. She was the eldest daughter of the famous physiologist Alexander Rollett, and sister of the publicist Edwin Rollett. She was the first woman to graduate from Graz in 1900 as an external student at the First State High School in Graz (today's Akademisches Gymnasium). Her father Alexander Rollett, who was the rector of the University of Graz, however, was reluctant to allow her to study at the university. On December 9, 1905, she was given a doctorate in medicine in the auditorium of the new university. Prior her, only Maria Schuhmeister, who was born in Vienna, had completed a degree in medicine from Graz. In 1906 Oktavia Rollett was assigned to the Graz regional hospital as an unpaid assistant doctor.

Oktavia Rollett was the first doctor at the General Hospital in Graz (Paulustor) to work as an unpaid assistant doctor. Then (in 1906/1907) she got a job as a secondary doctor in the surgical department of the private Anna Children's Hospital. In 1907 she started her own practice as a general practitioner at Humboldtstraße 17, Graz, which she ran until 1952. In 1908 she married the anatomist Walter Aigner (1878 — 1950), with whom she would share three sons, including the mathematician Alexander Aigner (1909 — 1988) and the psychologist and high school teacher of geography and history Adalbert Aigner (1912 — 1979). In 1935 she was awarded the title of Medizinalrat. During the period of National Socialism in Austria she was a functionary of the League of German Girls.

Oktavia Rollett died on 22 May 1959. She is buried in the family grave at the Grazer Zentralfriedhof (Graz Central Cemetery).

== Honors ==
- A two-part memorial for Oktavia Aigner-Rollett was created in 1997 at Paulustor in front of the preclinical facility.
- The Aigner Rollett Guest Professorship for Women (Aigner-Rollett-Gastprofessur für Frauen) and Gender Studies at the Karl-Franzens-Universität Graz (University of Graz) was named in her honor.
- In 2014, an urban retirement home in Geidorf was renamed after her name.
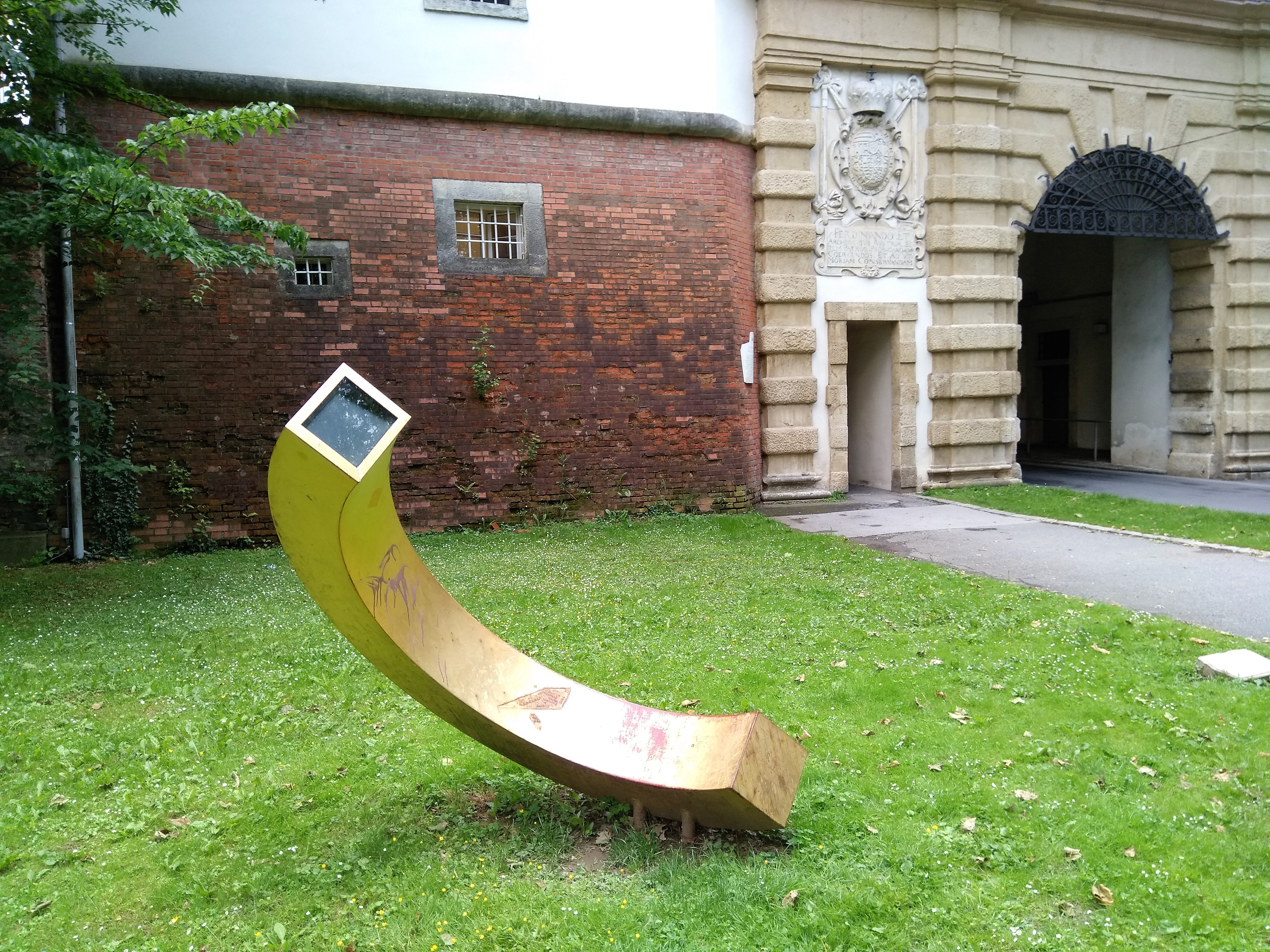
Memorial by Barbara Baur-Edlinger in front of Paulustor

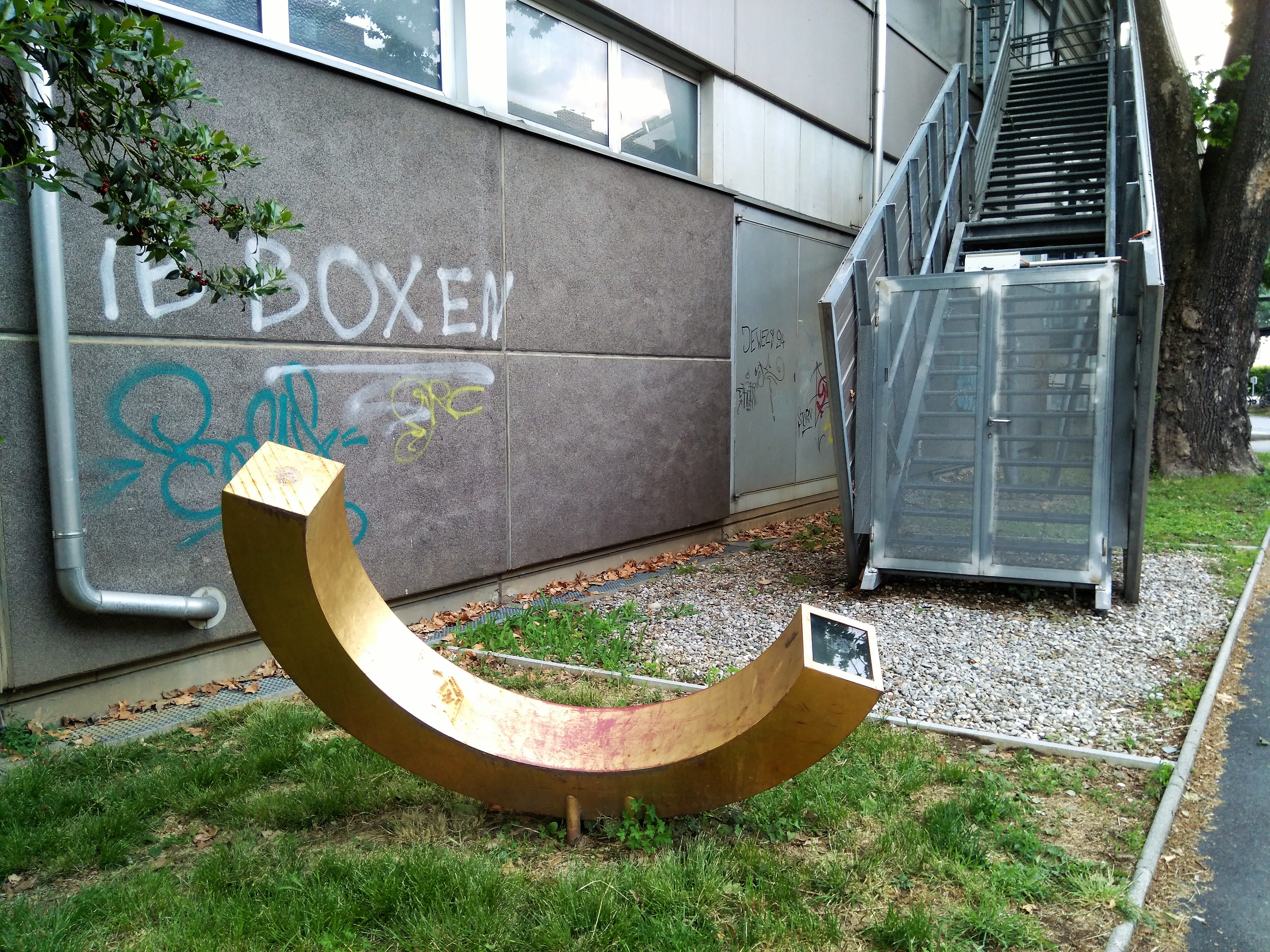
Memorial by Barbara Baur-Edlinger in front of the Graz preclinical facility
