= Post-traumatic stress disorder after World War II =

World War II lasted from September 1st, 1939 until September 2nd, 1945. The death toll during WWII has been estimated to be between 35,000,000 and 60,000,000. Over the decades, there have been various terms for the lasting effects on the survivors of WWII. These terms include, but are not limited to, shell shock and combat fatigue. In 1980, the diagnosis of PTSD was added to the newly published DSM 3.

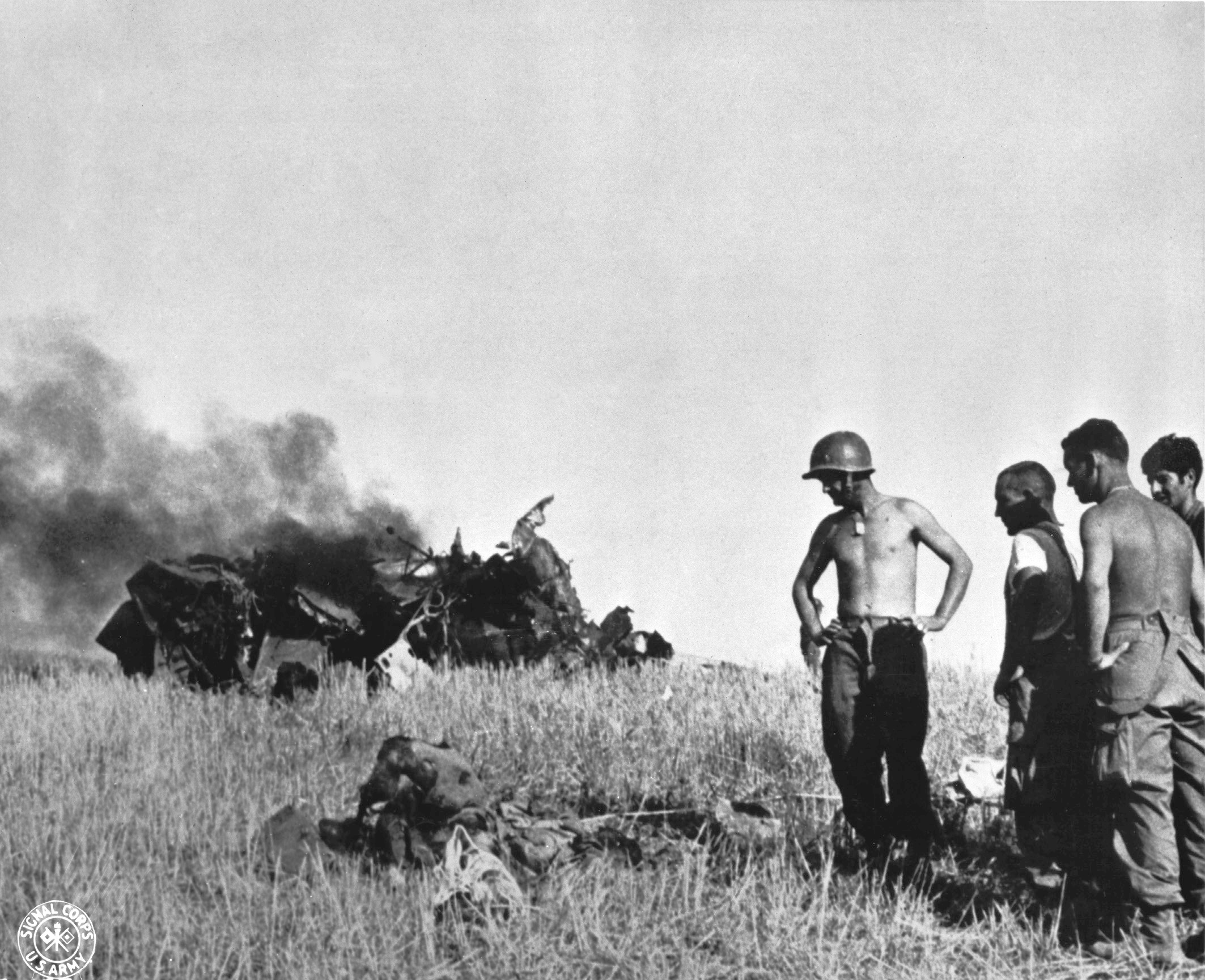
Traumas during WWII led to the development of PTSD.

A History of PTSD

Post Traumatic Stress Disorder(PTSD) was officially classified as a mental illness with the publication of the DSM 3 in 1980. However, records of PTSD symptoms trace back to ancient times. Modern records of PTSD can be traced back to the U.S. Civil War. Returning Civil War soldiers were reported as having a disordered palpitation of the heart, also known as soldier heart. Unexplained palpitations of the heart could categorize this. At the time, it was primarily associated with access to alcohol and tobacco usage. Today, distorted heart palpitation is considered one of the first combat-related PTSD symptoms. Following the Civil Wars, suicide rates among Union soldiers doubled. War neurasthenia was used to describe an undefined weakness in the nervous system. With WWI came the new diagnosis of Shell Shock. This new diagnosis theorized that compression and decompression of the brain due to being near explosions were the cause of various somatic symptoms. Under the shell shock terminology, a more psychological etiology. It was recognized that veterans often experience flashbacks and nightmares in association with their time in service. By the end of WWI 65, thousands of veterans relied on pensions based on their diagnosis of Shell Shock. At the end of WWII, up to 3% of WWII veterans were receiving government-based disability benefits due to neuropsychiatric diseases.

Post-traumatic stress disorder (PTSD) results after experiencing or witnessing a terrifying event which later leads to mental health problems. This disorder has always existed but has only been recognized as a psychological disorder within the past forty years. Before receiving its official diagnosis in 1980, when it was published in the third edition of the Diagnostic and Statistical Manual of Mental Disorders (DSM-lll), Post-traumatic stress disorder was more commonly known as soldier's heart, irritable heart, or shell shock. Shell shock and war neuroses were coined during World War I when symptoms began to be more commonly recognized among many of the soldiers that had experienced similar traumas. By World War II, these symptoms were identified as combat stress reaction or battle fatigue. In the first edition of the Diagnostic and Statistical Manual of Mental Disorders (DSM-I), post-traumatic stress disorder was called gross stress reaction which was explained as prolonged stress due to a traumatic event. Upon further study of this disorder in World War II veterans, psychologists realized that their symptoms were long-lasting and went beyond an anxiety disorder. Thus, through the effects of World War II, post-traumatic stress disorder was eventually recognized as an official disorder in 1980.

== General overview ==
=== Changing terminology ===
==== Nostalgia, soldier's heart, and railway spine ====
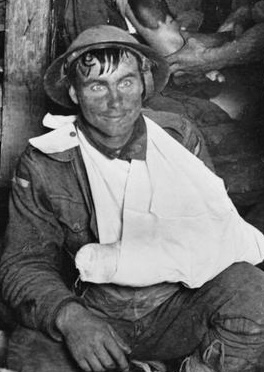
A soldier with shell shock.

The term nostalgia was first coined in 1761 when soldiers reported feeling homesick, sleep disturbances, and anxiety after being in combat. Later, soldier's heart was used to describe these symptoms but instead blamed cardiac problems as the source of anxiety and overstimulation. Railway spine also explained physical causes for PTSD symptoms. After railroad accidents became more common, the victims of these accidents exhibited emotional distress.

==== Shell shock and war neuroses ====
Before the term post-traumatic stress disorder was established, people that exhibited symptoms were said to have shell shock or war neuroses. This terminology came about in WWI when a commonality among combat soldiers was identified during psychiatric evaluations. These soldiers all appeared to be in a catatonic state following battle, or "shocked by shells", hence the term shell shocked.

==== Battle fatigue and combat stress reaction ====
During World War II, the diagnosis for shell shock was replaced with combat stress reaction. These diagnoses resulted from soldiers being in combat for long periods of time. There was some skepticism surrounding this diagnosis as some military leadership, including George S. Patton did not believe "battle fatigue" to be real. Yet, due to evolving practices, such as proximity, immediacy, and expectancy (PIE), this new diagnosis was taken seriously and recovery was made the first priority.

=== Prevalence ===
Post-traumatic stress disorder has always been prevalent whether it was recognized as a psychological disorder or not. Yet, because PTSD was not recognized as an official disorder, it is difficult to estimate what the prevalence rate during WWII was. A rough estimate, found through hospitalization records, suggests that approximately 43 per 1000 soldiers were hospitalized due to war traumas. Again, however, this estimate is only based upon those who actually sought help, with many at this time not seeking help. Another prevalence rate, found in the 1950s, suggests that about 10% of WWII soldiers had PTSD at some point. While it is difficult to retroactively discern prevalence for PTSD in WWII soldiers, what is clear is that it is prevalent now more than ever due to the long-lasting effects of combat in World War II. For example, half of all male veterans 65 and older have had military experience, which predisposes them to the acquisition of PTSD. Thus, PTSD continues to affect World War II veterans and their families.

In the 1990's a questionnaire was given to a sample of Dutch WWII veterans. Out of 4057 veterans 66 of them fall under the qualifications for a PTSD diagnosis. The higher percentage of these were people, who had been victims of persecution. The next highest was among military veterans. The lowest level was among those who served as civilians. In the 1990's VA treatment centers saw an increase of WWII vets reporting PTSD symptoms. This can be attributed to them entering retirement age: their children were now grown, which left them with more time alone with their thoughts.

PTSD symptoms can often come in waves for many WWII veterans. The media or other memorial services honoring those who served in the war can usually act as a trigger for PTSD. Longitudinal studies show a spike in PTSD symptoms among WWII veterans around the time of the 50th anniversary of the war. Some veterans reported a loss of interest in hobbies, being acutely aware of those around them, restlessness, and loss of sleep. These symptoms progressed following a television program documentary about Auschwitz. The symptoms gradually decreased in the months following the program. Other veterans reported having recurring symptoms of PTSD, such as flashbacks and anxiety. These symptoms increased around the 50th anniversary in 1995.( International journal of geriatric psychiatry 12.8 (1997): 862-7. ProQuest. Web. 17 Mar. 2024.)

=== Symptoms ===
Symptoms of post-traumatic stress disorder differ from person to person in that they can begin shortly after a traumatic event or even years after the event. Moreover, symptoms can continue to present long after the traumatic event's occurrence, with some people experiencing symptoms for the rest of their lives. Symptoms of PTSD can be grouped into four main categories: "Intrusive memories, avoidance, negative changes in thinking and mood, and changes in physical and emotional reactions".

- Intrusive memories can include symptoms such as nightmares, flashbacks, recurring memories of the event, and emotional and physical stress upon encountering things that remind them of their trauma.
- Symptoms for avoidance behavior include avoiding thoughts and conversations surrounding the event, as well as people, places, or other things that remind them of what happened. This, understandably, occurs due to intrusive memories that persistently take place, which makes PTSD patients want to avoid these feelings.
- Negative changes in thinking and mood can force patients into experiencing memory loss (especially in regard to the traumatic event), hopelessness about themselves and their future, difficulty maintaining relationships, and a struggle in experiencing positive emotions.
- Changes in physical and emotional reactions are seen through behaviors such as trouble sleeping, difficulty concentrating, always being on guard, and becoming startled easily. Some people experience these symptoms when they hear unexpected loud noises, which causes them to "[lose] their cool over minor everyday things". Other symptoms can include self-destructive actions such as excessive drinking or driving too fast and outbursts of anger or overwhelming guilt.

== Treatment ==
=== Treatments used during WWII ===
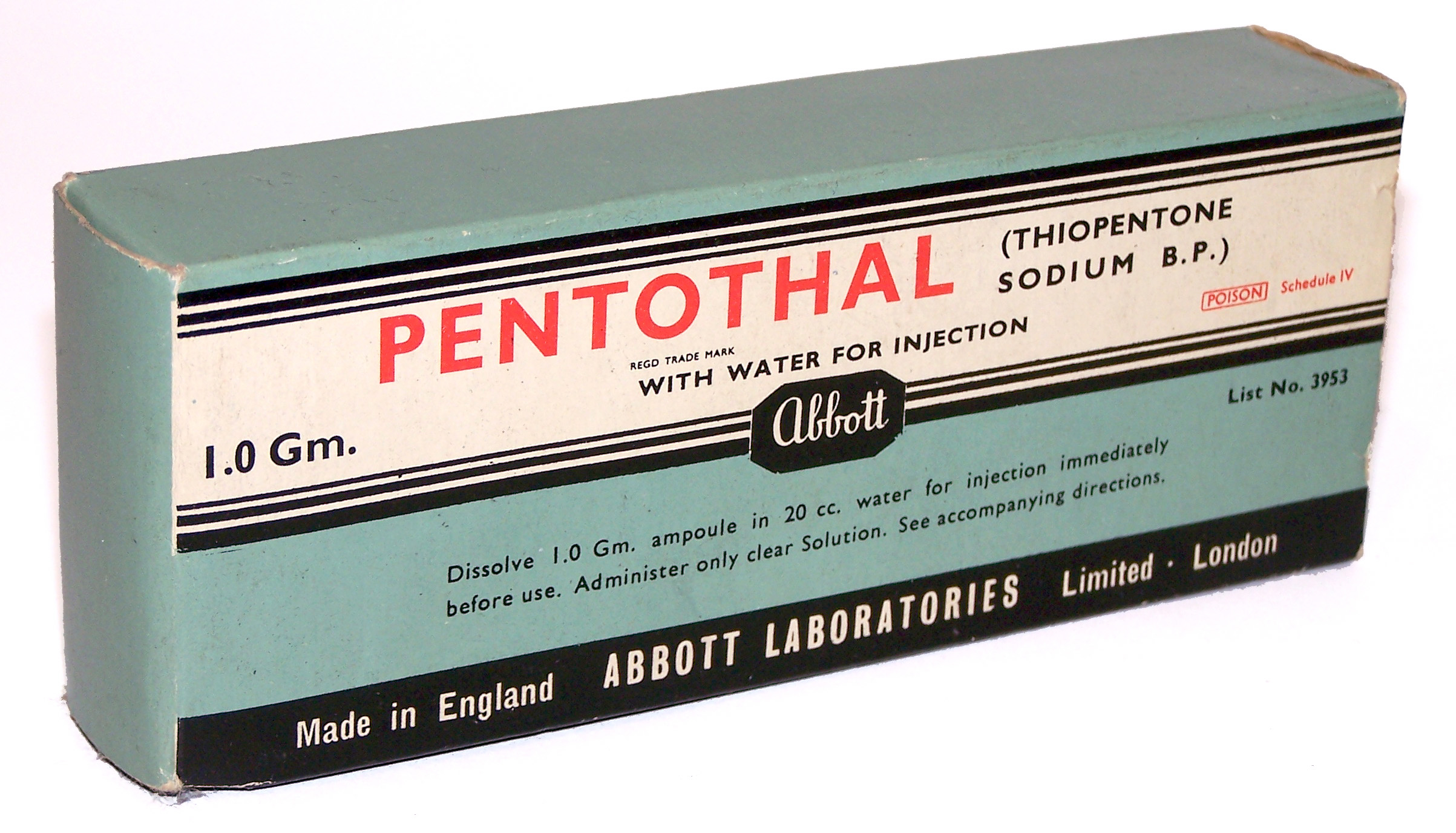
Sodium Pentothal, or truth serum, was used as a treatment for PTSD during WWII.

New treatment methods for PTSD emerged during WWII, likely due to the high demand for care, and the subsequent increase in investigation. Interestingly, despite little understanding of the mechanisms whereby PTSD happened, much of the early interventions by psychiatrists in the 1940s remain similar to the methods still used today, such as medications and group therapy.

One early treatment plan, from 1944, suggests a three part treatment to PTSD through use of sedatives to secure rest; use of intravenous barbiturates to promote mental catharsis, thereby assisting in the recall of a suppressed episode and use of drugs acting directly on the autonomic nervous system. In addition to medication plans, another method that was utilized for PTSD during WWII was the principle of proximity, immediacy, and expectancy, or "PIE". In essence, the PIE method emphasized immediate action in the treatment of PTSD. While first treatment plans for PTSD were crude and simplistic, they demonstrated the rapidly changing field of psychiatry that WWII initiated, as will be further discussed below.

=== Present treatments ===
Some successful treatment opinions for PTSD include exposure treatment, group therapy, or cognitive behavior therapy. PTSD research has been limited among the elderly, largely because many elderly PTSD sufferers choose not to seek treatment or drop out of treatment before it is finished. This has been a significant problem when diagnosing and treating WWII veterans. Many WWII veterans had delayed diagnoses. Because PTSD did not become a recognized diagnosis until 1980, by that time, WWII veterans were already entering their senior years.

== Broader impacts ==
=== Divorce rates following WWII ===
Following WWII, the high rates of shell-shocked veterans and prisoners of war (POWs) returning home largely impacted marital relationships. A correlation between war and higher divorce rates is typical, and extends to WWII vets, specifically ex-POWs since the rates of PTSD are much higher for this group. For example, it was found that 30% of POWs with PTSD experienced relationship problems, with only 11% of veterans without PTSD experiencing marital problems. Moreover, a different study found that being in active combat or on the front lines also increased likelihood of marital discord. From this, it can be suggested that those who have been in high stress situations, and have subsequently developed PTSD, have a higher prevalence of marital problems than those without PTSD. Those with PTSD likely have more marital problems due to slow adjustment back home, a lack of valuable communication/expression, intimacy problems, life disruption, economic problems, aggression, and lingering mental health impacts. Thus, the effects of PTSD on WWII vets were not isolated to the vets themselves, as evidenced through high rates of marital discord following the war.

POWS (Prisoners of war)

According to a 2009 study by the American Geriatrics Society, veterans from both the Pacific and European theatres reported suffering from dreams and flashbacks related to their time as prisoners of war. Higher rates of dreams and flashbacks were found among members of the Pacific theater. Among the 157 veterans surveyed for this study, 16.6% of participants fell within the requirements of a PTSD diagnosis. Within those statistics, 34% were from the Pacific theater, and only 12% were from the European theater. During WWII, 37% of POWS held by the Japanese died during their imprisonment. This is compared to 1% of European POWS. Both Pacific and European POW veterans reported having higher rates of PTSD symptoms after retirement.

In the 1980s, the Portland Origin Department of Veteran Affairs created a support group for former POWS veterans. J.B., a WWII veteran captured at the Battle of the Bulge, was reportedly critical of himself and distracted when recalling his time in captivity. Over two years, he and his family reported that he began to open up and became more talkative and relaxed in his personal life. This could be attributed to the presence of positive feedback and empathetic—relationships with other Pow survivors. Other members of the support group compared it with finding lost family members. (Journal of the American Geriatrics Society (JAGS), vol. 57, no. 12, 2009)

PTSD in Holocaust survivors

In 1997, A study was published in The Journal for Traumatic Stress comparing PTSD symptoms among Holocaust survivors who were in hiding versus those in concentration camps. Multiple regression was used in this study. In the survey (n=100), survivors were interviewed. Among the sample, thirty-three percent were men, and sixty-seven percent were women. The results of this study showed no significant difference in PTSD symptoms between survivors who were in camps versus hiding. There were some variations based on the age of the survivor at the time of the Holocaust. Survivors who were younger at the time were found to be more likely to experience psychogenic amnesia, detachment, and hypervigilance, whereas older survivors might have higher rates of associated nightmares. (“Individual Differences in Posttraumatic Stress Disorder Symptom Profiles in Holocaust Survivors in Concentration Camps or Hiding.” Journal of Traumatic Stress, 1997)

=== Development of psychiatry ===
During WWII the field of psychiatry was beginning to evolve, with a specific emphasis on military psychiatry due to the high rates of PTSD in soldiers. This can be seen in the changing technologies and aims of the American Psychological Association (APA) during the years that the United States was fighting in WWII. For example, between the years of 1943 and 1944, APA went from claiming that fear was the mechanism behind PTSD to attempting to understand the real underlying processes of PTSD, which represents a change in understanding of mental illnesses. Additionally, these years in APA history represent a switch from suggesting rest to soldiers to prescribing medications and having specified treatment plans. These changes in understanding were important to evolving psychiatry into what it is today; yet, the ideas about PTSD during WWII were still in their infancy, meaning that psychiatrists during WWII made some unethical choices. For example, two famous military psychiatrists by the names of Roy Grinker and Frederick Hanson implemented mandatory sodium pentothal treatments, which were intended to induce the truth during psychoanalysis for soldiers claiming "exhaustion". These treatments have since been proven harmful rather than helpful. Yet, it was through these initial contributions that the DSM-I was published in 1952, thus proving WWII as a pivotal time for the advancement of psychiatry.

== Personal accounts ==
The impacts of PTSD from wartime trauma vary from person to person, yet the degree of trauma often indicates the severity of the PTSD. Additionally, other pre-existing factors, such as personality or preparedness, also play into the development of PTSD in a veteran. Much like how no two people are alike, no two veterans will have the exact same experiences with PTSD, yet, there can still be commonalities such as negative homecoming experiences or lack of social support. With this being said, one way to gain a better understanding of both the similarities and differences of PTSD among WWII veterans is through reading first-hand accounts that emphasize both the chronicity and longevity of war-time PTSD.

In the 1990s a questionnaire was given to a sample of Dutch WWII veterans. Out of 4057 veterans 66 of them fall under the qualifications for a PTSD diagnosis. The higher percentage of these were people, who had been victims of persecution. The next highest was among military veterans. The lowest level was among those who served as civilians. In the 1990s VA treatment centers saw an increase of WWII vets reporting PTSD symptoms. This can be attributed to, them entering retirement age. Their children were now grown. Which left them with more time alone with their thoughts.

=== Earl Crumby ===
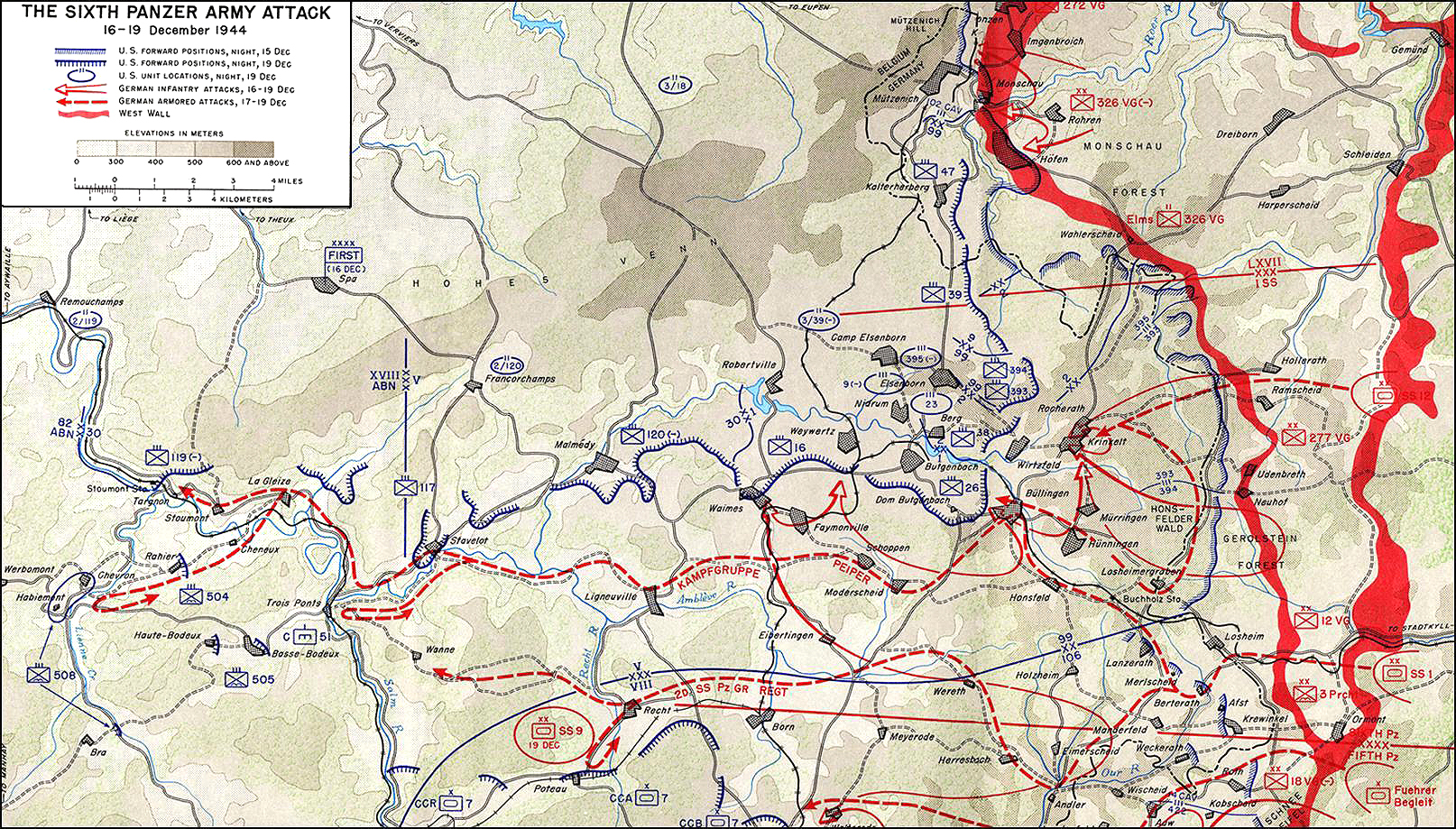
An overview map of the battle that Earl Crumby fought in.

71 years after the Battle of the Bulge, Earl Crumby sat down with Tim Madigan in 2015 to be interviewed about his part in it. At the time of the interview, his wife had just recently died and yet, he is quoted as saying, "as dearly as I loved that woman, her death didn’t affect me near as much as it does to sit down here and talk to you about seeing those young boys butchered during the war. It was nothing but arms and legs, heads and guts".

=== Otis Mackey ===
When Otis Mackey was interviewed by Tim Madigan in 2015, his traumatic war experiences had not diminished over the years, but rather had increased in severity. Mackey is quoted saying, "I get that empty feeling, just deep down, and I don’t care whether I live or die". In addition to emptiness, Mackey also has strong flashbacks of comrades being blown up and intense nightmares of bombs going off. "I seen it coming at me. I just ducked, and McGhee’s leg went flying right by my head...I never could figure out why it was him and not me".

=== Dutch Shultz ===
Portrayed in the 1962 movie, The Longest Day, Dutch Shultz is remembered as an innocent and happy paratrooper. Yet, this idealized version bears little resemblance to the real Shultz, who is quoted as saying, "people did not want to know what it was like". Based on accounts from Shultz's daughter, Carol, her father was always drinking in order to take the pain of war away. Additionally, according to Carol, her father "would wake up with nightmares every single day", and even tried to take his own life. This account from both Shultz and his daughter emphasize both the chronicity and longevity of the traumas of war as well as shows that PTSD did not just impact those with the disorder. Dutch Shultz never got help for his PTSD, and Carol went her entire life having a half-present, drunk father.

=== Roy "Eric" Cooper ===
Roy "Eric" Cooper fought in the Burma campaign, and according to his daughter Ceri-Ann, "every second of every day, Burma was with him, even to his last breath". While he was alive, Cooper is quoted as saying troubling things such as, "I don’t feel very well in my mind and I am a bad man". Much like the other accounts, this account emphasizes the longevity of his war traumas as well as the hopelessness in Cooper's life.

=== Norman Bussel ===
Norman Bussel served as a crewman on a B-17 bomber in the European theater which was shot down and he subsequently spent a year as a prisoner of war. In 2015, he wrote an article for The Washington Post sharing the trauma of his experiences and describing how as a counselor for veterans of the Iraq and Afghanistan wars at a VA Hospital he shared his own experience with them to help persuade them to open up to him. Bussel wrote that due to his trauma, including claustrophobia from 12 days in a cell at a Luftwaffe interrogation center, he avoided elevators, crowds, and fireworks and did not fly unless he had an aisle seat. He also wrote that his strongest stressor was survivor guilt over the deaths of four crewmates when his aircraft was shot down, and that helping veterans file for VA benefits did more than anything else to alleviate it. According to Bussel, "PTSD is not particularly associated with WWII vets, partly because the term didn’t emerge until after the war in Vietnam, and partly because we downplayed its effects. We’re “the greatest generation,” the ones that lived through the Depression and returned home as heroes. But war is war." On mental healthcare for veterans shortly after they returned from World War II, Bussel wrote that "For those of us who recognized that we had a problem, a trip to a VA hospital for help quickly convinced us that they didn’t have a clue as to what was wrong with us. So we went back to our jobs and self-medicated with alcohol at night and on weekends. Lucky for us, recreational drugs were yet to become widespread."

=== Grover Chapman ===
In April 2008, World War II veteran Grover Chapman took a taxi to his local VA hospital in Greenville, SC. He then took out his 38-calibre revolver and killed himself. Chapman had been repeatedly denied a formal PTSD diagnosis. Despite having shown PTSD symptoms for decades. Just a few weeks later, then-president hopeful Barack Obama called this incident a ''betrayal of the ideals we ask our troops to risk their lives for". During a campaign speech in Charleston, WV.(The Canadian Press, Nov 28 2009, ProQuest. Web. 21 Mar. 2024.)

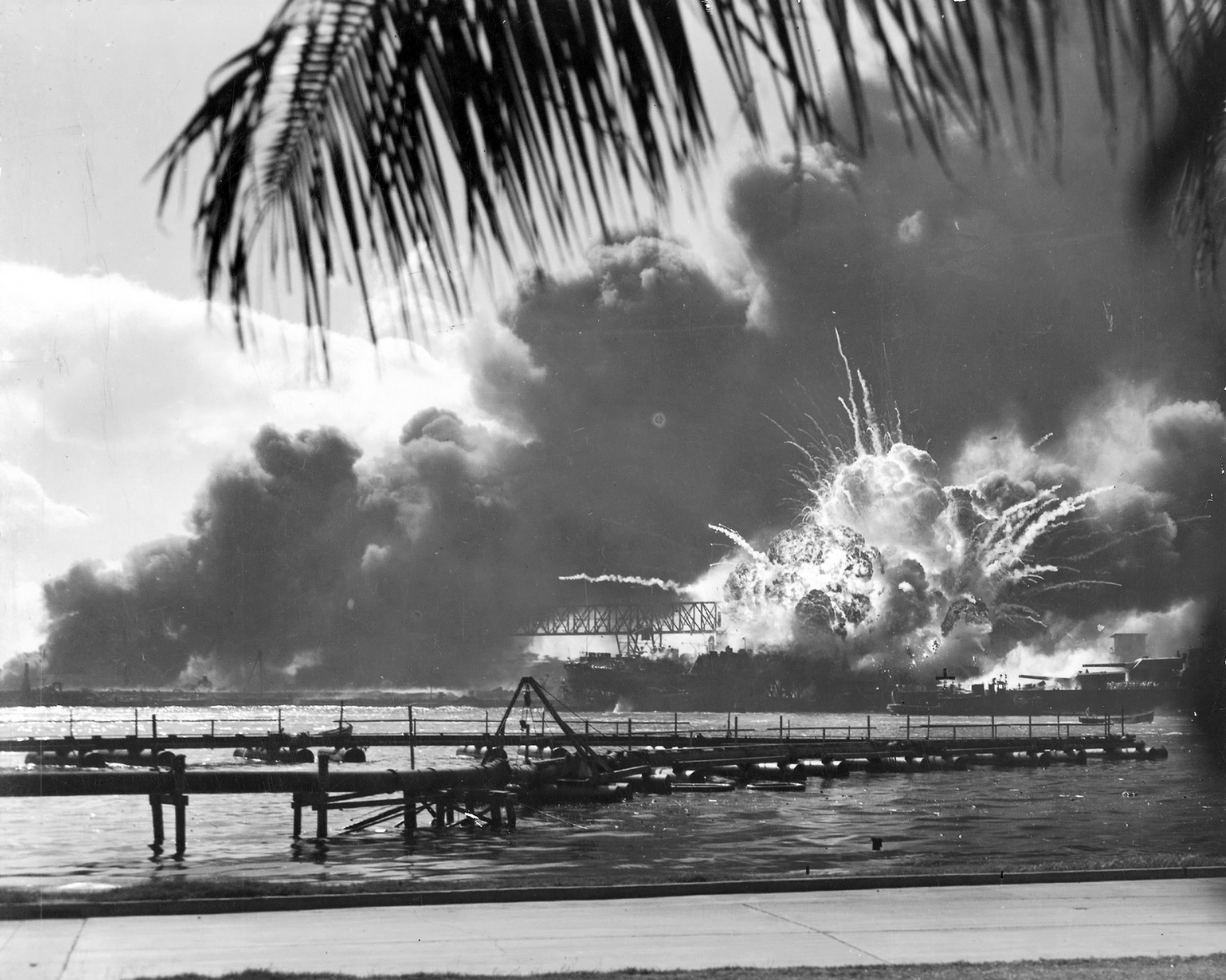
Bombings, such as those at Pearl Harbor, can cause the development of PTSD in both veterans and non-veterans.

=== Anonymous accounts ===
In 2011, researchers collected quotes from survivors of WWII atomic bombs in order to determine the level of health among survivors. The survivors of these bombings range in age from 75 to 92, with both veterans and non-veterans included. While non-veteran's experiences are often overlooked, their levels of health were similar to those who had seen combat. This suggests that non-veteran's experiences with PTSD can be just as severe, and therefore important, as that of veteran's experiences. The following anonymous quote, from a veteran who experienced the bombing at Pearl Harbor, is one of many from the 2011 research that suggests that the trauma seen within WWII has a strong relationship to a lifetime of PTSD.

There were too many kids in the water. And it's hard to pass up someone in the water. We saw real early on that . . . the ones that were squished bad . . . you couldn't get em' in the launch. You couldn't do nothing for em' . . . We took loads of em' and we could hold about 60 . . . In the meantime, we went back out and it just kept repeatin' itself.

== See also ==
- Combat stress reaction
- Complex post-traumatic stress disorder
- Old sergeant's syndrome
- Post-traumatic stress disorder
- Psychological trauma
- National trauma
