= Lajos Abafi =

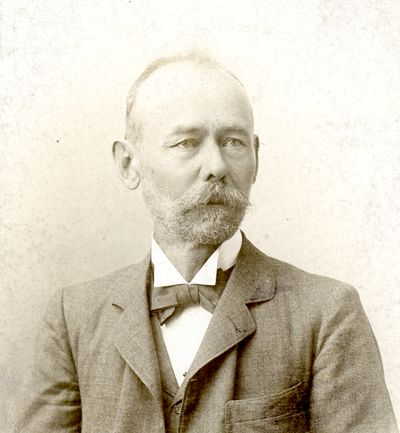
- Born: Ludwig Abafi-Aigner; February 11, 1840; Nagyjécsa, Kingdom of Hungary, Austrian Empire
- Died: June 19, 1909 (aged 69); Budapest, Austria-Hungary
- Citizenship: Hungarian
- Scientific career
- Fields: Lepidoptera

Lajos Abafi or Ludwig Abafi-Aigner (11 February 1840 in Nagyjécsa, Kingdom of Hungary, Austrian Empire – 19 June 1909 in Budapest, Austria-Hungary) was a Hungarian editor, a librarian and entomologist.

His family, of German origin, moved to Pozsony (today Bratislava) in 1858. There, he learned the Hungarian language. His family then moved to Pest in 1863. Ludwig part completed his studies in Cologne and part in Stuttgart. He was especially interested in Lepidoptera and he founded a popular library. In 1870, he became a freemason. He worked for twelve years on a history of freemasonry. He changed his first name Ludwig to its Hungarian form, Lajos, and he assumed his "nom de plume" Abafi. His enterprise declined during the years 1880 to 1890, when he closed it. From 1890, he was entirely devoted to entomology. He published his observations in the revue of the Budapest museum Természetrajzi Füzetek and participated as editor and author in the Fauna Regni Hungariae. His book, Magyarország lepkéi (butterflies of Hungary) of 1907, was extremely popular and influenced many generations of entomologists of his country.

== Partial list of publications ==
- A magyar népdalról (Pest, 1872)
- Mikes Kelemen (Pest, 1872)
- Feszler Ignác Aurél (1878)
- Geschichte der Freimaurerei in Österreich-Ungarn, 5 vols. (Budapest, 1890–1899)
- A szabadkőművesség története Magyarországon (Budapest, 1900)
- Az olaszországi magyar légió történetéhez
- Magyarország lepkéi (Budapest, 1907)

== Sources ==
- Hangay, George (2004). "Abafi-Aigner, Lajos (Ludwig Aigner)". In Capinera, John L.; et al. (eds.). Encyclopedia of Entomology. Vol. 1. Dordrecht: Kluwer Academic Publishers. p. 1. ISBN 978-0-7923-8670-4. Archived from the original on 2014-01-21.
