= Old sergeant's syndrome =

Type of military burnout

The term old sergeant's syndrome is used to describe symptoms of psychological disturbance exhibited by officers in military units that suffer heavy casualties. It is most common in cohesive military squads that have strong interpersonal relationships among officers.

The term was first introduced in a study published by Sobel in 1947. Sobel described soldiers who were "burnt out" and "worn out." These soldiers were previously highly dedicated and very efficient. However, after prolonged, continuous exposure to combat, they began to exhibit negative psychological symptoms such as difficulty making decisions, being reluctant to accept responsibility for others, and preferring routine, simple tasks over more challenging ones.

More serious symptoms included a loss of self-confidence, anxiety, depression and a tendency to make self-deprecatory remarks. They also had difficulty making friends and were reluctant to interact with new recruits. According to Sobel, the soldiers’ ability to carry out their duties deteriorated to the point that they became a handicap to their units, but their motivation to carry out the assigned mission remained strong.

Ninety percent of men that developed this type of battle reaction were infantry foot soldiers. These men were either original members of the division or had been with it for extended periods of time, with an average overseas service of 23 months. Hence, they were the last "old men" in their platoon or company.

The cohesiveness of the unit likely initially provided psychological support for the individual. However, the loss of comrades during battle causes severe distress. When the unit is reinforced with replacements, many soldiers are reluctant to establish emotional ties with the newcomers, mainly in fear of the pain they recently experienced. As a result, they become isolated from the group.

In many respects, old sergeant's syndrome is similar to the phenomenon of burnout as the term has since evolved in the civilian literature.

== See also ==
- Post-traumatic stress disorder after World War II

== Additional reading ==
- Horwitz, Tony. "Did Civil War Soldiers Have PTSD?". Smithsonian Magazine.
- "Medicine: Old Sergeant Syndrome". Time. 13 February 1950. ISSN 0040-781X.
