= Andreas Eigner =

German painter (1801–1870)

- Born: 1801; Diedldorf, Upper Palatinate
- Died: 1870 (aged 68–69); Augsburg
- Occupations: Painter and a restorer
- Known for: Varnish of his own invention

Andreas Eigner (1801–1870), who was born at Diedldorf, Upper Palatinate, distinguished himself as a painter and a restorer of old pictures. He successfully employed alcoholic vapours, and a varnish of his own invention, to protect paintings against the destructive influence of the atmosphere. He was chiefly employed in the galleries of Munich, Augsburg, Stuttgart, Carlsruhe, Basle, and Solothurn. He died at Augsburg in 1870.

== See also ==
- List of German painters
