= Fritz Aigner =

Austrian graphic artist and painter

Fritz Aigner (July 13, 1930 – January 9, 2005) was an Austrian graphic artist and painter.

== Biography ==
Aigner studied at the Academy of Fine Arts Vienna from 1947 to 1952. In 1952 he won an Austrian state fine arts prize for his artwork Die Klage des verlorgenen Sohnes. He worked later as an artist in Spain, Ireland, London and his hometown, Linz.

Aigner's work was overtly influenced by that of Rembrandt, notably in his oil painting Rembrandts Trick mit dem Licht. He was nicknamed "the Rembrandt of Linz". His artwork often featured dark, acherontic and apocalyptic scenes with allusions to society and well-known society figures.

After his death an Austrian journalist described Aigner as "an artist who dealt with the conflict areas eros and religion and between surrealism, realism and fantastic realism. Even allusions to the border of caricature can be found in his work."

Aigner's first marriage to the woodcut artist Auguste Kronheim ended in divorce and in 1969 he married Helga Aigner, with whom he had six children. He had exhibitions with three of his sons, Paul Florian, Matthias Claudius and Lukas Johannes Aigner, who also became artists. He died at the age of 74 in the Wagner-Jauregg Hospital in Linz.

== Selected works ==
- Amerikaner
- Sauregurkenzeit
- Orpheus und Eurydike
- Kannibalismus an einem Dichter
- Selbstporträt mit doppelten Augen
- Zachers Requiem für Oskar Schimonek

== Exhibitions ==
The Nordico Museum in Linz, Aigner's hometown, scheduled an exhibition of his work for the period September 29, 2008, to January 11, 2009, with the title "Child Prodigy and Painting Machine". A book with the same title was released in conjunction with the exhibition.
