= Chieming =

- Municipality
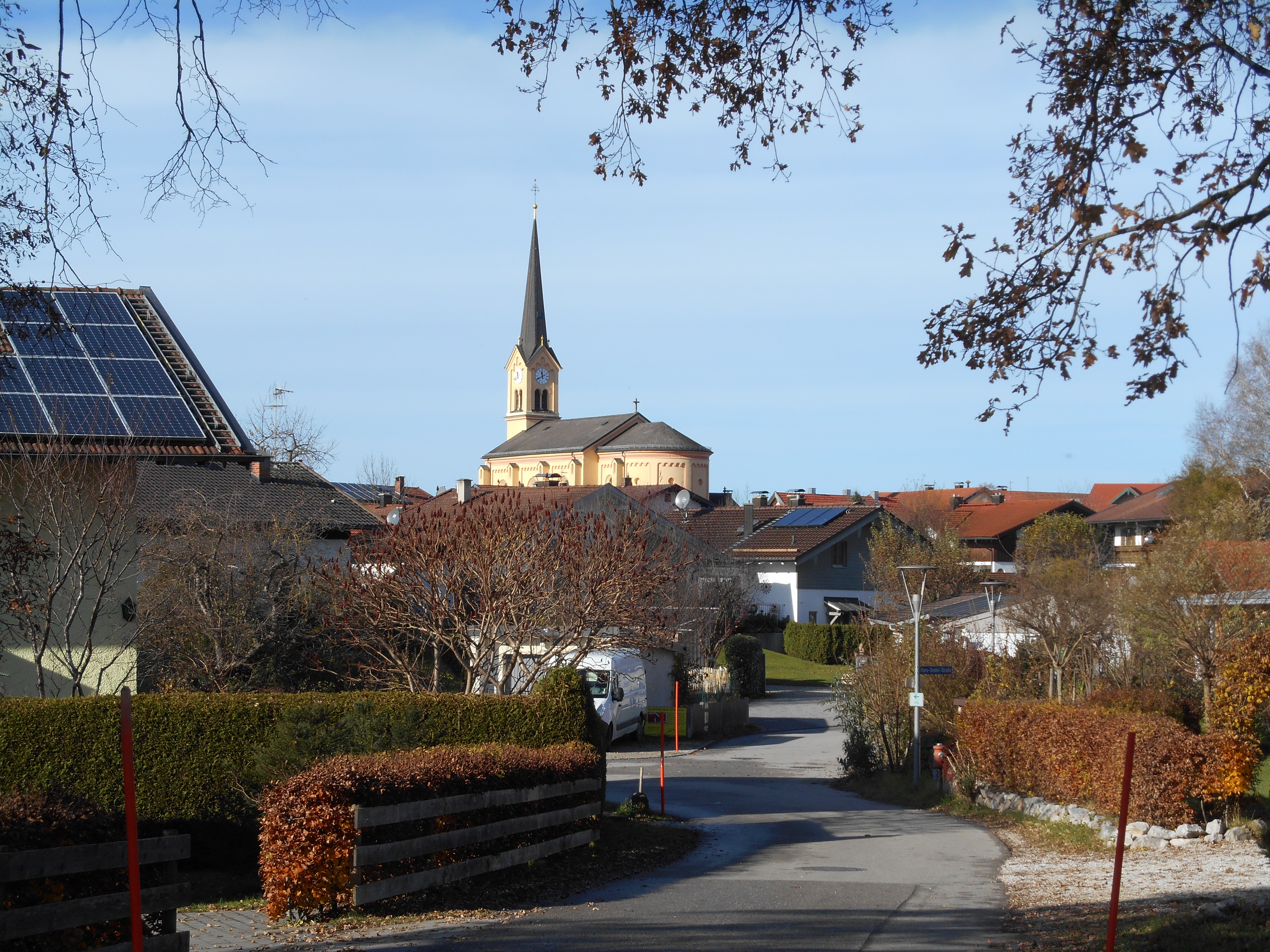
- Chieming am Chiemsee

- Coat of arms

- Location of Chieming within Traunstein district
- Interactive map of Chieming
- Location within Germany Location within Bavaria
- Coordinates: 47°54′N 12°32′E
- Country: Germany
- State: Bavaria
- Admin. region: Oberbayern
- District: Traunstein

Government
  - Mayor (2020–26): Stefan Reichelt (CSU)

Area
  - Total: 37.73 km^{2} (14.57 sq mi)
- Elevation: 537 m (1,762 ft)

Population (2025-12-31)
  - Total: 4,781
  - Density: 126.7/km^{2} (328.2/sq mi)
- Time zone: UTC+01:00 (CET)
  - Summer (DST): UTC+02:00 (CEST)
- Postal codes: 83339
- Dialling codes: 08664
- Vehicle registration: TS
- Website: www.chieming.de

Chieming (German pronunciation: [ˈkiːmɪŋ]) is a municipality in the district of Traunstein in Bavaria, Germany.

== Climate ==
Climate data for Chieming (1991–2020 normals)
Month	Jan	Feb	Mar	Apr	May	Jun	Jul	Aug	Sep	Oct	Nov	Dec	Year
Mean daily maximum °C (°F)	3.3 (37.9)	5.1 (41.2)	9.6 (49.3)	15.0 (59.0)	18.5 (65.3)	22.5 (72.5)	24.1 (75.4)	23.5 (74.3)	18.9 (66.0)	14.5 (58.1)	8.3 (46.9)	4.7 (40.5)	14.0 (57.2)
Daily mean °C (°F)	−0.2 (31.6)	0.6 (33.1)	4.5 (40.1)	9.4 (48.9)	13.1 (55.6)	17.2 (63.0)	18.6 (65.5)	18.0 (64.4)	13.7 (56.7)	9.7 (49.5)	4.5 (40.1)	1.0 (33.8)	9.5 (49.1)
Mean daily minimum °C (°F)	−3.4 (25.9)	−2.7 (27.1)	0.4 (32.7)	3.8 (38.8)	7.9 (46.2)	12.0 (53.6)	13.2 (55.8)	12.8 (55.0)	9.2 (48.6)	5.4 (41.7)	1.0 (33.8)	−2.1 (28.2)	4.9 (40.8)
Mean monthly sunshine hours	70.9	95.9	143.7	202.3	195.9	224.7	241.1	230.1	172.9	130.9	80.1	72.4	1,843.1
Source: NOAA

== Etymology ==
The name Chieming, Chiemsee and the name of the area Chiemgau go back to the Old High German personal name Chiemo (7th/8th century). At the end of the 8th century the name Chiemgau appeared for the first time in documents as Chimigaoe but it stood at that time for a smaller area around the village of Chieming.

== Education ==
In Chieming there are

- 3 kindergartens
- a primary- and middle school,
- the Gymnasium Landschulheim Schloss Ising
