= Rudolf Aigner =

Austrian footballer

Personal information
- Birth name: Rudolf Emil Aigner
- Date of birth: 24 October 1903
- Place of birth: Vienna, Austria-Hungary
- Date of death: 11 December 1975 (aged 72)
- Place of death: Vienna, Austria
- Position: Goalkeeper

International career
Years	Team	Apps	(Gls)
1924–1926	Austria	13	(0)

Rudolf Emil Aigner (24 October 1903 – 11 December 1975) was an Austrian footballer. He played in 13 matches for the Austria national football team from 1924 to 1926.
