= Franz Heritsch =

Austrian paleontologist

Franz Heritsch (26 December 1882 in Graz – 17 April 1945 in Graz) was an Austrian geologist and paleontologist, known for his studies of the Paleozoic of the Eastern Alps.

From 1902 to 1906 he studied at the University of Graz, and following graduation, worked as a middle school teacher in Graz. In 1909 he obtained his habilitation, and later on, served as an associate (1921–24), and full professor (1924–45) of geology and paleontology at the University of Graz. He was a member of the Austrian Academy of Sciences.

== Published works ==
His book, Die Deckentheorie in den Alpen (1927–28), was translated into English and published with the title "The nappe theory in the Alps (Alpine tectonics, 1905-1928)". Other noted works by Heritsch are:

- Druckschriften von Dr. Rudolf Hoernes : 1872-1905, (1906) – Pamphlets by Dr. Rudolf Hoernes from 1872 to 1905.
- Beiträge zur Geologie der Grauwackenzone des Paltentales (Obersteiermark), 1912 – Contributions to the geology of the Greywacke zone of the Paltentales (Upper Styria).
- Die österreichischen und deutschen Alpen bis zur alpino-dinarischen grenze (Ostalpen), 1915 – The Austrian and German Alps to the Alpino-Dinaric border (Eastern Alps).
- Geologie von Steiermark, 1921 – Geology of Styria.
- Die grundlagen der alpinen tektonik, 1923 – The basis of Alpine tectonics.
- Die Entstehung der Hochgebirgsformen, 1927 – The emergence of high mountain forms.
- Faunen aus dem Silur der Ostalpen, 1929 – Fauna from the Silurian of the Eastern Alps.
