= Akademisches Gymnasium (Graz) =

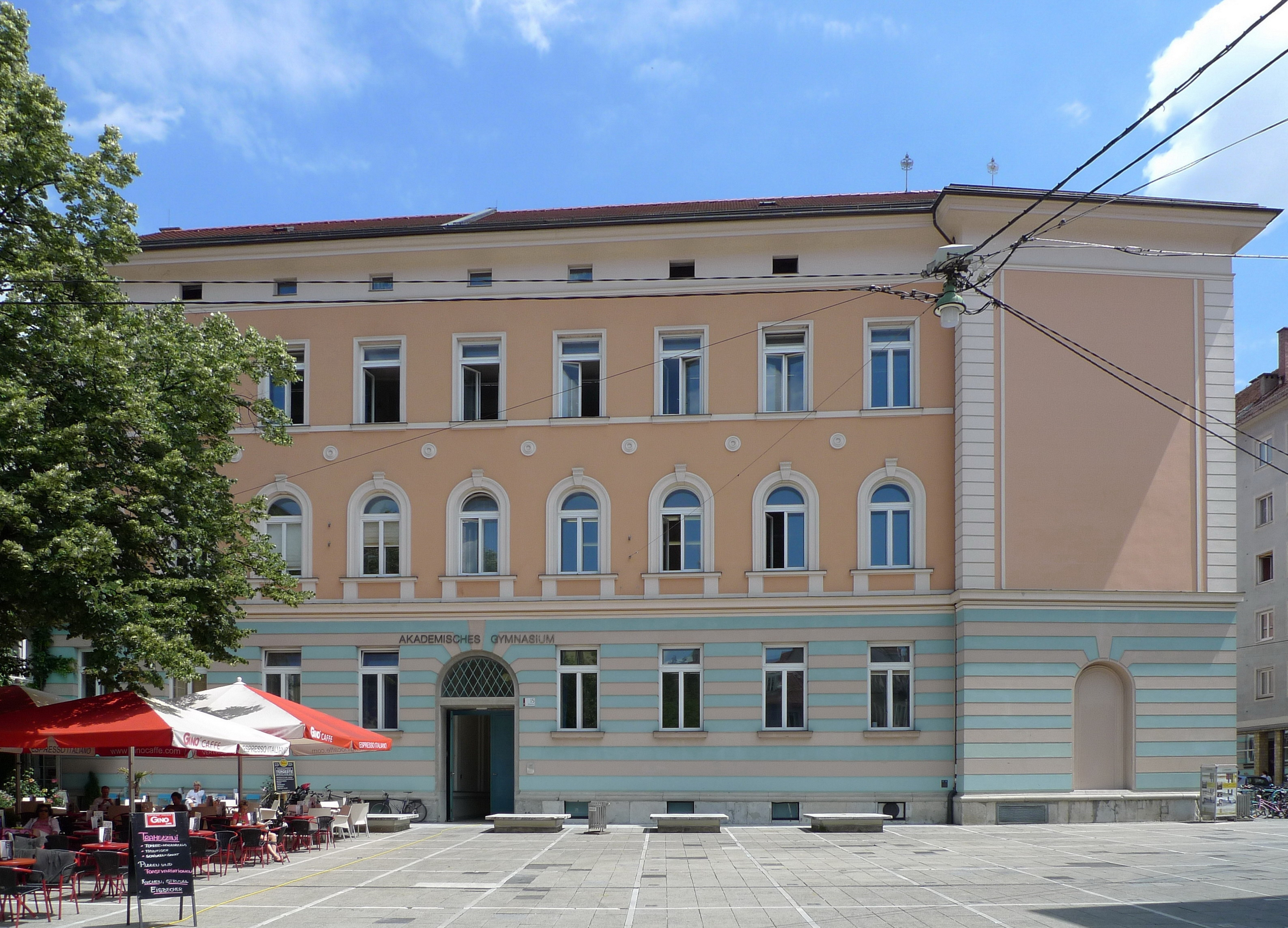

Location
- Bürgergasse 15; Graz, Styria, 8010; Austria
- 47.0698°N 15.4433°E

Information
- Type: Gymnasium grammar school
- Founded: 1573; 453 years ago
- Founder: Charles II, Archduke of Austria
- Head of school: Franz Hasenhütl
- Teaching staff: 56 (2022/23)
- Age range: 10 - 18
- Enrollment: 568 (2022/23)
- Website: www.akademisches-graz.at

The Akademisches Gymnasium is a coeducational gymnasium grammar school located in Graz, Styria, Austria. Founded in 1573 by Charles II, Archduke of Austria, it is the oldest secondary school in Graz.

== Overview ==
Akademisches Gymnasium Graz teaches modern languages situated providing also Latin and optional Greek, as regular school subjects. On average there are 24 classes, some 550 students and about 60 teachers.

The school's main aim is to develop the students' potential to the full and to help them grow into successful, caring and respectful young people. In order to achieve this, Akademisches provides corporate teamwork (learners/teachers/parents/administration) and a safe, supportive environment for students within which their academic, cultural and emotional needs are met, sometimes even beyond the statutory curriculum.

Not only with its course system in upper forms can students set their own priorities in their school careers (science, languages etc.) but also by taking part in school partnerships, trips abroad, cooperation with universities, competitions on all levels, school projects, artistic activities, exhibitions, social projects and lots more.

Specially trained teachers assist gifted and talented students in developing their skills. Furthermore, there is a day-care facility for students aged 10 to 14 until 5 p.m. They receive professional help with their homework, but there is also room for individual activities.

== See also ==
- List of Jesuit educational institutions
