= Edward Hebern =

Edward Hugh Hebern (April 23, 1869 – February 10, 1952) was an early inventor of rotor machines, devices for encryption.

== Background ==
Edward Hugh Hebern was born in Streator, Illinois, on April 23, 1869. His parents were Charles and Rosanna (Rosy) Hebern. They met in Harris County, Texas while Charles was serving as guard and escort from the civil war. On February 4, 1866, they married in Harris, Texas. Rosanna was only fifteen years old. After mustering out of the service on May 29, 1866, Charles and his new wife returned to Springfield, Illinois, and on June 18, 1866, he received his final pay and discharge.

Edward had an older sister, Arizona (Zoa) born in 1867, two younger brothers, Daniel Boone Hebern, born on February 17, 1871, and William Hebern, born April 8, 1875, in Houston, Texas, as well as a younger sister, Nellie Hebern, born in 1874.

At the age of 6, on August 4, 1875, Edward Hugh and three of his siblings were admitted to the Illinois Soldiers’ and Sailors’ home in Normal, Illinois. According to the Soldiers’ home register their father was listed as having died in 1874 in an unknown location, but he was admitted to the same Soldiers’ Home 40 years later. By February 13, 1879, the youngest Hebern child, William, was admitted to the Soldiers’ Home. Six months later on August 12, 1879, Rosanna married Archibald Thompson in Bloomington, Illinois.

On June 14, 1881, two months before her 14th birthday, Zoa left the Soldiers’ Home. Edward was discharged from the Soldiers’ Home in May 1883, after turning 14, and went to Odin, Illinois where he worked on a farm. By 1885, Daniel, Nellie, and William were all in Odin, Illinois. Zoa married Edward F. Clark (27 yrs. old) on August 18, 1886, in Coffey County, Kansas. Then they headed to Utah.

The rest of the children eventually moved to Madera, Ca. beginning with the two eldest boys in 1896. Daniel Boone Hebern was in North Fork, California working as a laborer; his brother, Edward Hugh Hebern was in Madera farming. Daniel purchased two plots of land in North Fork.

== Patent ==
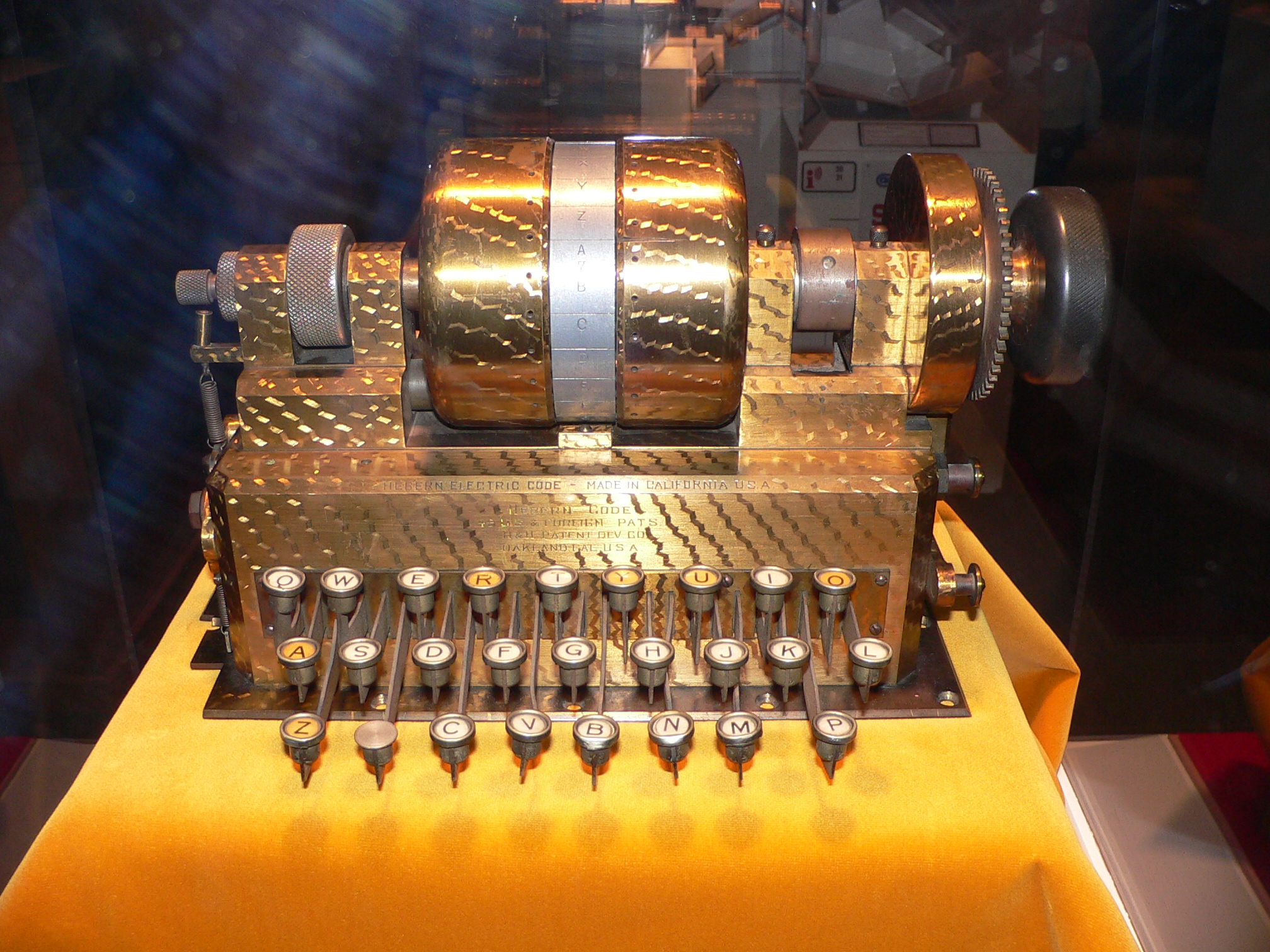
Hebern's electric code machine

He got a patent in 1918, shortly before three others patented (in other countries) much the same thing. They were Arthur Scherbius in Germany, Hugo Koch in the Netherlands, and Arvid Damm in Sweden. Hebern started a company to market the Hebern rotor machine; one of his employees was Agnes Meyer, who left the Navy in Washington, D.C., to work for Hebern in California. Scherbius designed the Enigma, Koch sold his patent to Scherbius a few years later, and Damm's company — taken over by Boris Hagelin after his death — moved to Switzerland and is still in existence, as Crypto AG.

By September 1922 Hebern started construction of the Hebern Building at 829 Harrison Street in Oakland, California. The striking two-story structure was built to accommodate 1,500 workers and had a luxurious office for Hebern. The 1923 stockholders’ report said it was “one of the most beautiful structures in California and said to be the only building in the State of true Gothic architecture throughout.” By the time it was completed the following year, it had cost somewhere between $380,000 and $400,000, and the company still had no income. In fact, its first sale, to the Italian government, was still twenty-three months away. Eventually Hebern would sell twelve of his early machines to the Navy, the Pacific Steamship Company of Seattle, and a few other buyers, but his ambitious building was repossessed. The Hebern code building still stands today at 829 Harrison Street in Oakland and is primarily used as Oakland’s Asian resource center.

Hebern's implementation of his idea was less secure than he believed, for William F. Friedman found at least one method of attack when it was offered to the US Government. Hebern's company did not prosper, his promotional efforts for it were questioned, and he was tried and convicted for fraud. Agnes Meyer returned to Washington to work for the Navy.

Friedman went on to design a much more secure and complex rotor machine for the US Army. It eventually became the SIGABA.

== Patents ==
- US 1096168
- US 1510441
- US 1683072
- US 1861857
- US 2373890
