= M-325 =

American cryptography machine

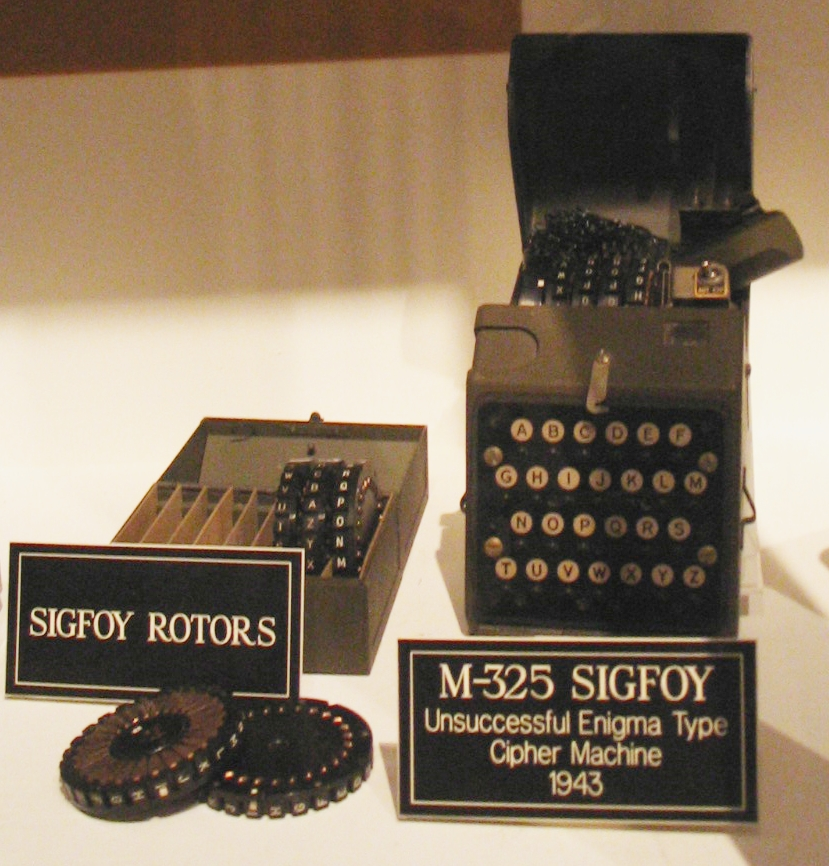
- The M-325 (SIGFOY) cipher machine was inspired by the German Enigma
- Date invented: 1944
- Type: rotor machine

In the history of cryptography, M-325, also known as SIGFOY, was an American rotor machine designed by William F. Friedman and built in 1944. Between 1944 and 1946, more than 1,100 machines were deployed within the United States Foreign Service. Its use was discontinued in 1946 because of faults in operation. Friedman applied for a patent on the M-325 on 11 August 1944; it was and was granted on 17 March 1959 (US patent #2,877,565).

Like the Enigma, the M-325 contains three intermediate rotors and a reflecting rotor.

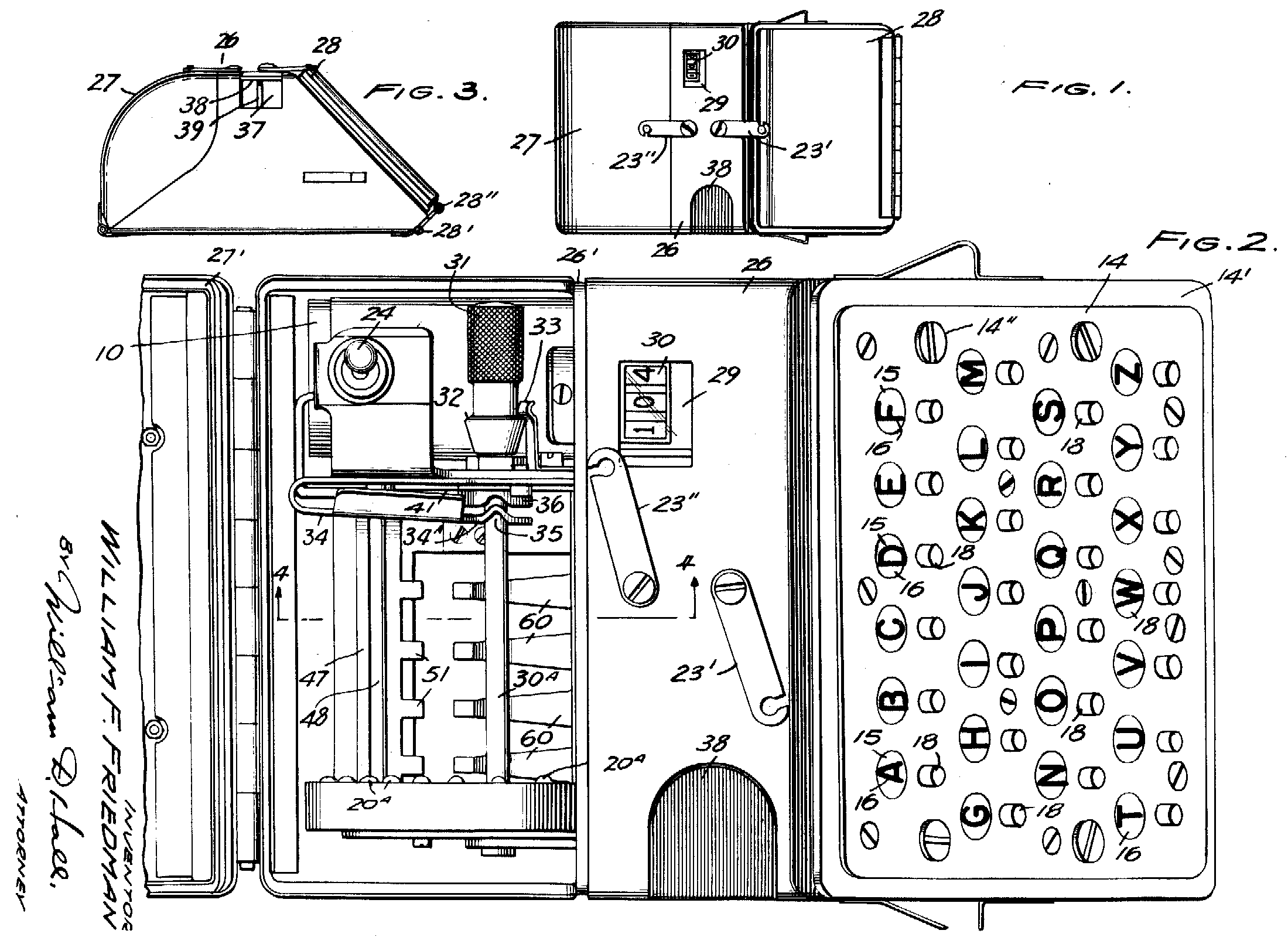
Friedman patented the design of the M-325 in US patent #2,877,565.

== See also ==
- Hebern rotor machine
- SIGABA
