= Singlet =

Singlet may refer to:

- singlet state, in theoretical physics, a quantum state with zero spin
- Singlet fission, in molecular photophysics
- in spectroscopy, an entity appearing as a single peak; see NMR spectroscopy
- in optics, a single lens element, the building blocks of lens systems; see lens (optics)
- a one-piece collarless garment, also known as a sleeveless shirt or vest
  - wrestling singlet, a one-piece garment specific to wrestling
- BID/60, a British encryption machine
- Singlet oxygen, the common name used for an excited form of molecular oxygen
