= Cryptogram (disambiguation) =

A cryptogram is a short, coded text.

Cryptogram may also refer to:

- The Cryptogram, a play by David Mamet
- Cryptograms, a studio album by Deerhunter
- A newsletter published by Bruce Schneier
- A journal published by the American Cryptogram Association
- The cryptogram a novel by James De Mille

== See also ==
- Cryptograph, a former Swedish company
- Cryptogam, a type of plant
- Cryptogramma, a genus of ferns
