= H54 =

H-54 may refer to:

- Sikorsky CH-54 Tarhe US Army heavylift helicopter.
- Sikorsky S-64 Skycrane civilian heavylift helicopter.
- Eriksson Skycrane civilian heavylift helicopter.
- Hell 54 German cipher machine
