= HX-63 =

Advanced rotor machine by Boris Hagelin

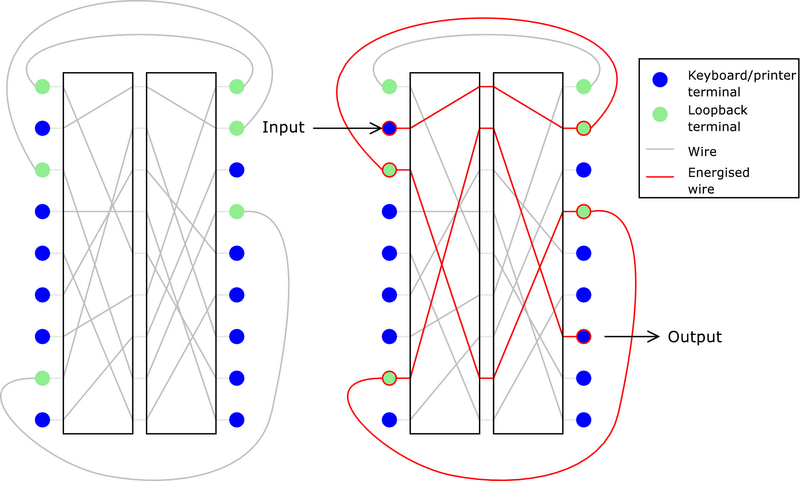
- A diagram of a loopback-rotor construction; in this simplified example, two rotors with nine contacts each are used. There are six inputs and outputs, leaving three loop-back wires.
- Type: rotor machine

The HX-63 was an advanced rotor machine designed by Crypto AG founder Boris Hagelin. Development of the device started in 1952 and lasted a decade. The machine had nine rotors, each with 41 contacts. There were 26 keyboard inputs and outputs, leaving 15 wires to "loop back" through the rotors via a different path. Moreover, each rotor wire could be selected from one of two paths. The movement of the rotors was irregular and controlled by switches. There were two plugboards with the machine; one to scramble the input, and one for the loop-back wires. The machine also used a technique called reinjection (also called reentry), which increased its security exponentially. The machine could be set up in around 10^{600} different configurations.

William Friedman, the first chief cryptologist of the U.S. National Security Agency (NSA), was alarmed when he read Hagelin's patent on the machine. Friedman realized that the machine was more secure than the NSA's KL-7 and unbreakable. Friedman and Hagelin were good friends from World War II, and Friedman called on Hagelin to terminate the program, which CryptoAG did.

Only twelve of these machines were manufactured, and it was adopted by only one department of the French Government (about 1960).

== See also ==
- KL-7
