= Arvid Gerhard Damm =

Swedish engineer and inventor (1869–1928)

- Born: 7 August 1869
- Died: 7 November 1928 (aged 59)
- Occupations: Engineer, inventor

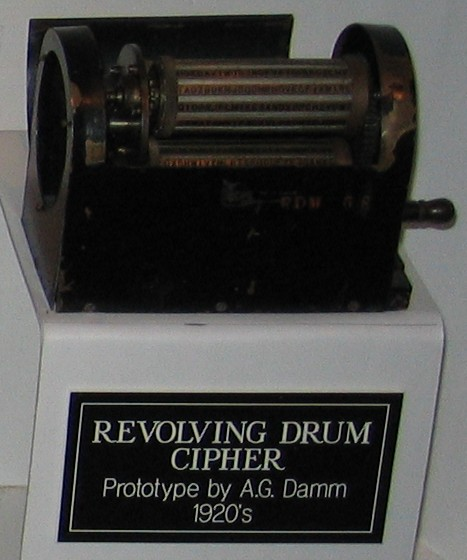
A prototype of one of Damm's machines.

Arvid Gerhard Damm (7 August 1869 – 7 November 1928) was a Swedish engineer and inventor. He designed a number of cipher machines, and was one of the early inventors of the wired rotor principle for machine encipherment. The company, AB Cryptograph, was an early predecessor of Crypto AG.

== Biography ==
Originally a textile engineer, he was headmaster of a weaving school in Borås, Sweden, before moving to Finland to work as a manager of a textile factory. Although already married with a son, he fell in love with a circus performer from Hungary whose opposition to a relationship he overcame by arranging a sham civil wedding ceremony in 1900 with an officiant and two witnesses. His new “wife”, with whom he then lived for 19 years, only became aware of the situation when Damm found a new romantic interest and wanted a divorce. After a long and acrimonious legal battle, in which he denied ever being married to her and accused her of being a spy, he was ordered to pay alimony but refused and fled to France.

Damm designed a number of crypto machines, based on patents filed in Sweden, the US and many other countries. His most notable invention is that of the rotor principle, laid down in a patent application filed in Sweden on 10 October 1919, three days after Hugo Koch applied for a similar invention in the Netherlands.

To exploit his ideas, a company named AB Cryptograph was founded. Originally founded as a patent consortium, Cryptograph was established on 15 June 1915. The company itself began a year later. Cryptograph never became economically viable despite capital infusions by Emanuel Nobel, brother of Alfred Nobel. When Damm’s legal shenanigans in connection with his faked marriage became too much of an embarrassment, he was forced to give up his position in the company and moved to France where he died in 1928. In 1925, Boris Hagelin was placed in charge of the management of the company and the development of its products, having joined AB Cryptograph in 1922.

Damm's first machines for Cryptograph were the "Mecano Cryptographer Model A-1" and its interoperable portable counterpart, Model A-2, both produced in 1917. The A-1 was fitted with a keyboard. A later version (1921) could print the plaintext together with two copies of the plaintext onto tape. The machine used a chain of links, which could be reassembled by the user as part of the key. Some of the links moved a 25-disk "key body" forward, some back.

The A-21 (1923) and the A-22 (1925) consisted of a cylinder with 26 mixed alphabet strips around it. Another strip, bearing the normal A–Z alphabet was nearby, and could take one of two positions, dependent on the movement of chain similar to the A-1. In operation, the cylinder rotated one step, as did the chain, controlling the position of the reference alphabet. To encipher or decipher (the system was set up to be reciprocal), a letter could be read off from the reference alphabet to a cylinder alphabet using a slit at the top of the machine.

== Achievements and legacy ==
Damm was an ingenious inventor and quick to adapt to new possibilities. In the 1910s and early 1920s no other cryptographic inventor had patents and working machines of such complexity and diversity. Damm was one among the four inventors of permutation wheels (the other three being Scherbius, Koch and Hebern). He was first with a number of innovations and ideas such as

- Storing a cryptographic key as a binary sequence, first as a chain of links, later on a pinwheel
- The use of an ”Influence letter”, an autokey function
- Cryptologic checksums to prevent illegal manipulation
- Superenciphering digital codes into pronouncable letter groups. This reduced the cost of telegraphy with up to 50%
- Designing electromechanical equivalents of delay shift registers and XOR gates.

Despite having no cryptographic experience, Boris Hagelin managed to use the ideas of Damm´s B-13 to develop a crypto machine, B-21, which was to compete with Enigma for sales to the Swedish General Staff. In 1928 that order was secured. Boris Hagelin also participated in the development of a machine based on A-22, called A-34. There are no records about a serial production of the A-34.

== Inventions, production and sales ==
The following cryptomachines were designed and built, based on Damm´s inventions.

Model	Name	Year	Notes
	Cryptotyper	1914	Joint invention with George Lorimer Craig. Developed 1912-1914. A working prototype was shown to the War Office and the Colonial Office in London in July 1914. The machinery was left with George Craig in Huddersfield, UK and is probably not extant.
A-1	Mecano Cryptographer	1917	The compatible pair A-1 and A-2 were delivered from production early 1917, 30 A-1´s and 10 A-2´s. Altogether 18 A-1´s were sold, five of them to the Finnish government.
A-2	Hand cryptographer	1917	The compatible pair A-1 and A-2 were delivered from production early 1917, 30 A-1´s and 10 A-2´s. Altogether 18 A-1´s were sold, five of them to the Finnish government.
	Cylinder cipher	1918	Only a prototype produced.
A-1(b)	Electro Mechanical Cryptographer	1921	These were modernised versions of the machines from 1917. A-1(b) printed output on paper strips. Only one machine A-1(b) was sold.
A-2(b)	Hand Cryptographer	1922	These were modernised versions of the machines from 1917. A-1(b) printed output on paper strips. Only one machine A-1(b) was sold.
B-1	Electrocryptograph Encryptor/Transmitter	1919; 1922	This machine was designed and shown in a working model in the summer of 1919. It was a machine for automated encryption of telegraphic traffic. Production of machines took a long time and it was not until 1922 that two machines were delivered to the Swedish PTT for operational testing. There were operational problems with the machines and no more machines were produced.
A-4	Code superencryptor A-4	1922	The machine was intended for superencipherment of codes. Codes were a common way of encipherment but some were wellknown and others had low security, hence superencipherment was needed. As a benefit transmission costs for the messages could be cut to the half. Only two machines were produced.
B-13	Electrocryptograph Encryptor/Transmitter	1925	B-13 was a development from B-1 with simplified modular design to improve reliability. 20 machines were produced, a number of them sold to South East Asia via the Dutch East India Company.
A-21	Portable cryptographer	1923	A-21 was a prototype for the A-22 and probably produced in only one copy. At least 20 A-22´s were produced but no sales are recorded. A copy of all of machines except (1) and (6) are still extant in museums or collections.
A-22	Portable cryptographer	1925	A-21 was a prototype for the A-22 and probably produced in only one copy. At least 20 A-22´s were produced but no sales are recorded. A copy of all of machines except (1) and (6) are still extant in museums or collections.

== Patents ==
The following patents concerning cryptography were issued to Damm in Sweden, with their United States counterparts:

- Swedish patent SE45343, filed 1915-07-20 U.S. patent 1,233,035 — "Apparatus for Producing a Series of Signs", filed 1915-07-21.Implemented in A-1.
- Swedish patent SE52279 filed 19

19-10-10,U.S. patent 1,502,376 — "Production of Ciphers", filed 1920-04-02. Implemented in B-1.

- Swedish patent SE57005, filed 1921-03-24U.S. patent 1,484,477 — "Apparatus for Ciphering and Deciphering Code Expressions", filed 1922-03-25. Implemented in A-4.
- Swedish patent SE59906, filed 1921-03-02,U.S. patent 1,540,107 — "Apparatus for the Production of Cipher Documents Especially For Telegraphic Dispatch", filed 1922-03-01. Implemented in B-1.
- Swedish patent SE61104 filed 1923-09-28, U.S. patent 1,644,239 — "Apparatus for Producing a Series of Signs", filed 1924-09-25. Implemented in A-22.
- Swedish patent SE65901, filed 1924-06-27 U.S. patent 1,663,624 — "Electric Apparatus", filed 1925-08-31.Implemented in B-13.

== Sources ==
1. Beckman, Bengt. Codebreakers: Arne Beurling and the Swedish crypto program during World War II, p. 17-19.
2. Kahn, David. The Codebreakers, 1967, 2nd edition 1996, Chapter 13.
3. McKay, C.G. and Beckman, Bengt. Swedish signal intelligence 1900-1945. Frank Cass, London 2003. p 25-28.

== See also ==
- Edward Hebern
- Arthur Scherbius
