= Mercury (cipher machine) =

British cipher machine

Mercury was a British cipher machine used by the Air Ministry from 1950 until at least the early 1960s. Mercury was an online rotor machine descended from Typex, but modified to achieve a longer cycle length using a so-called double-drum basket system.

== History ==
Mercury was designed by Wing Commander E. W. Smith and F. Rudd, who were awarded £2,250 and £750 respectively in 1960 for their work in the design of the machine. E. W. Smith, one of the developers of TypeX, had designed the double-drum basket system in 1943, on his own initiative, to fulfil the need for an on-line system.

Mercury prototypes were operational by 1948, and the machine was in use by 1950. Over 200 Mercury machines had been made by 1959 with over £250,000 spent on its production. Mercury links were installed between the UK and various Overseas stations, including in Canada, Australia, Singapore, Cyprus, Germany, France, Middle East, Washington, Nairobi and Colombo. The machine was used for UK diplomatic messaging for more or less a decade, but saw almost no military use.

In 1960, it was anticipated that the machine would remain in use until 1963, when it would be made obsolete by the arrival of BID 610 (Alvis) equipment.

A miniaturised version of Mercury was designed, named Ariel, but this machine appears not to have been adopted for operational use.

== Design ==
In the Mercury system, two series of rotors were used. The first series, dubbed the control maze, had four rotors, and stepped cyclometrically as in Typex. Five outputs from the control maze were used to determine the stepping of five rotors in the second series of rotors, the message maze, the latter used to encrypt and decrypt the plaintext and ciphertext. A sixth rotor in the message maze was controlled independently and stepped in the opposite direction to the others. All ten rotors were interchangeable in any part of either maze. Using rotors to control the stepping of other rotors was a feature of an earlier cipher machine, the US ECM Mark II.

Mercury also used double-wired rotors, consisting of "Inside and Outside Scrambled Wheels", the Outer wheels being settable in a number of positions with respect to the Inner wheels.

== Security ==
It had been mathematically determined that Typex had a sufficiently large cycle to permit only 750 characters to be sent using a single arrangement of its rotors without fear of compromising security. A counter recorded the number of keystrokes and when these reached 750 a predetermined rotor was manually advanced one step, thus permitting TypeX to safely encrypt messages with more than 750 key strokes.

Mercury, with its longer cycle length, was judged to be safe even after 56700 characters had passed on one setting of the rotors. This cycle length was sufficient for the machine to be used as an on-line cipher machine with traffic flow security — the machine would transmit continuously, even if not sending a message.

== See also ==
- 5-UCO
