= Hugo Koch =

Dutch inventor (1870–1928)

Hugo Alexander Koch (9 March 1870, Delft – 3 March 1928, Düsseldorf) was a Dutch inventor who conceived of and patented an idea for machine encryption, the rotor machine, although he was not the first to do so. He is sometimes erroneously credited as the originator of the Enigma machine; this has been shown instead to be the work of German engineer Arthur Scherbius.

Koch filed for his rotor machine patent on 7 October 1919, and was granted Netherlands patent 10,700 (equivalent to U.S. patent 1,533,252), held by Naamloze Vennootschap Ingenieursbureau Securitas in Amsterdam. No machine was built from his patents, and, in 1927, he assigned the rights to Arthur Scherbius, the inventor of the Enigma machine. Scherbius had developed the idea of rotor machine encryption independently from Koch, and had filed for his own patent in 1918. Bauer (1999) writes that Scherbius bought Koch's patents "obviously not because he did not own patents before; presumably he wanted to protect his patents".

== See also ==
- Edward Hebern
- Arvid Damm
