= BID/60 =

British encryption machine

Singlet
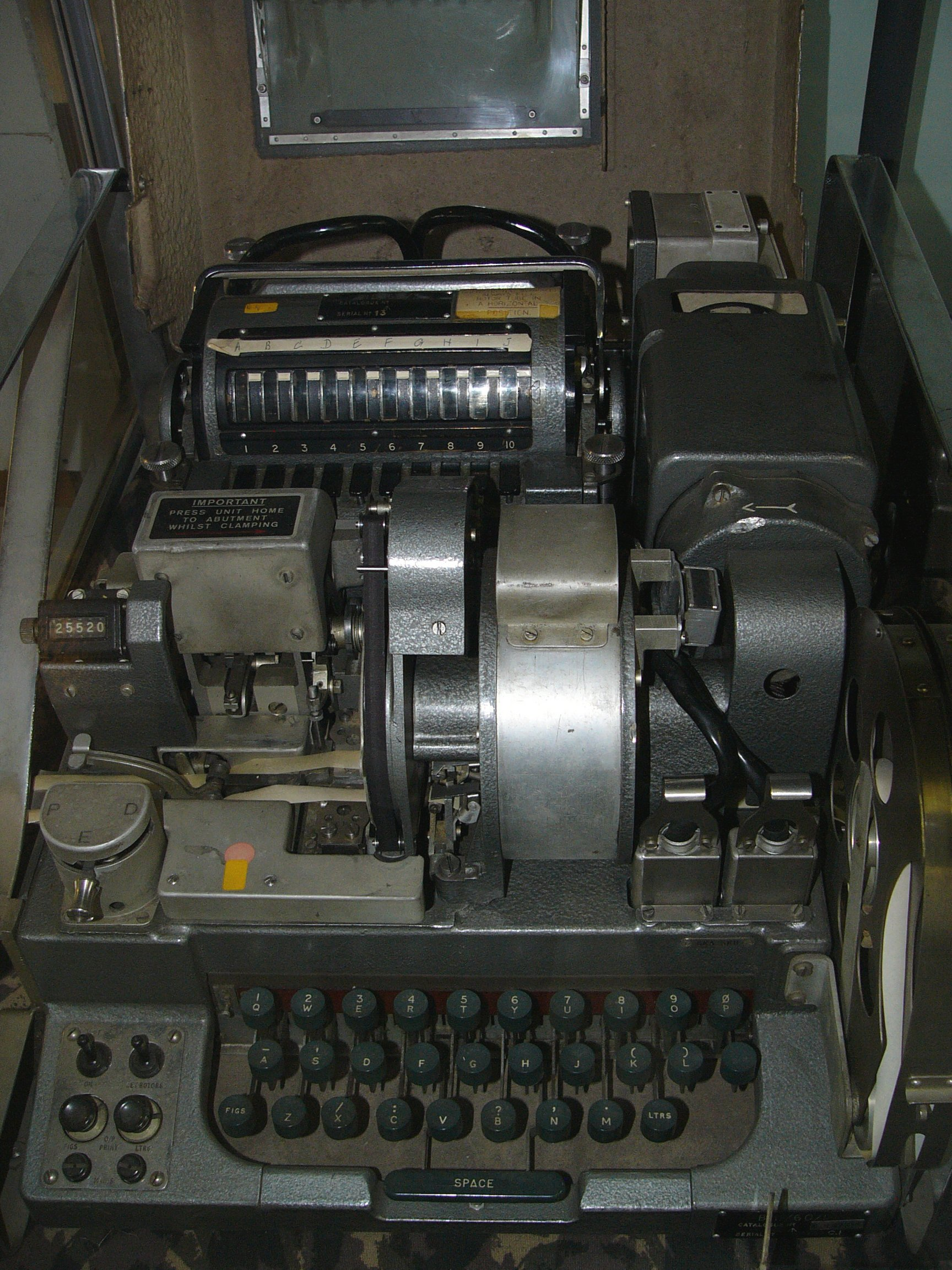
- A Singlet machine on display at Bletchley Park
- Type: rotor machine

BID/60, also called Singlet, was a British encryption machine. It was used by the British intelligence services from around 1949 or 1950 onwards. The system is a rotor machine, and would appear to have used 10 rotors. There are some apparent similarities between this machine and the US / NATO KL-7 device.

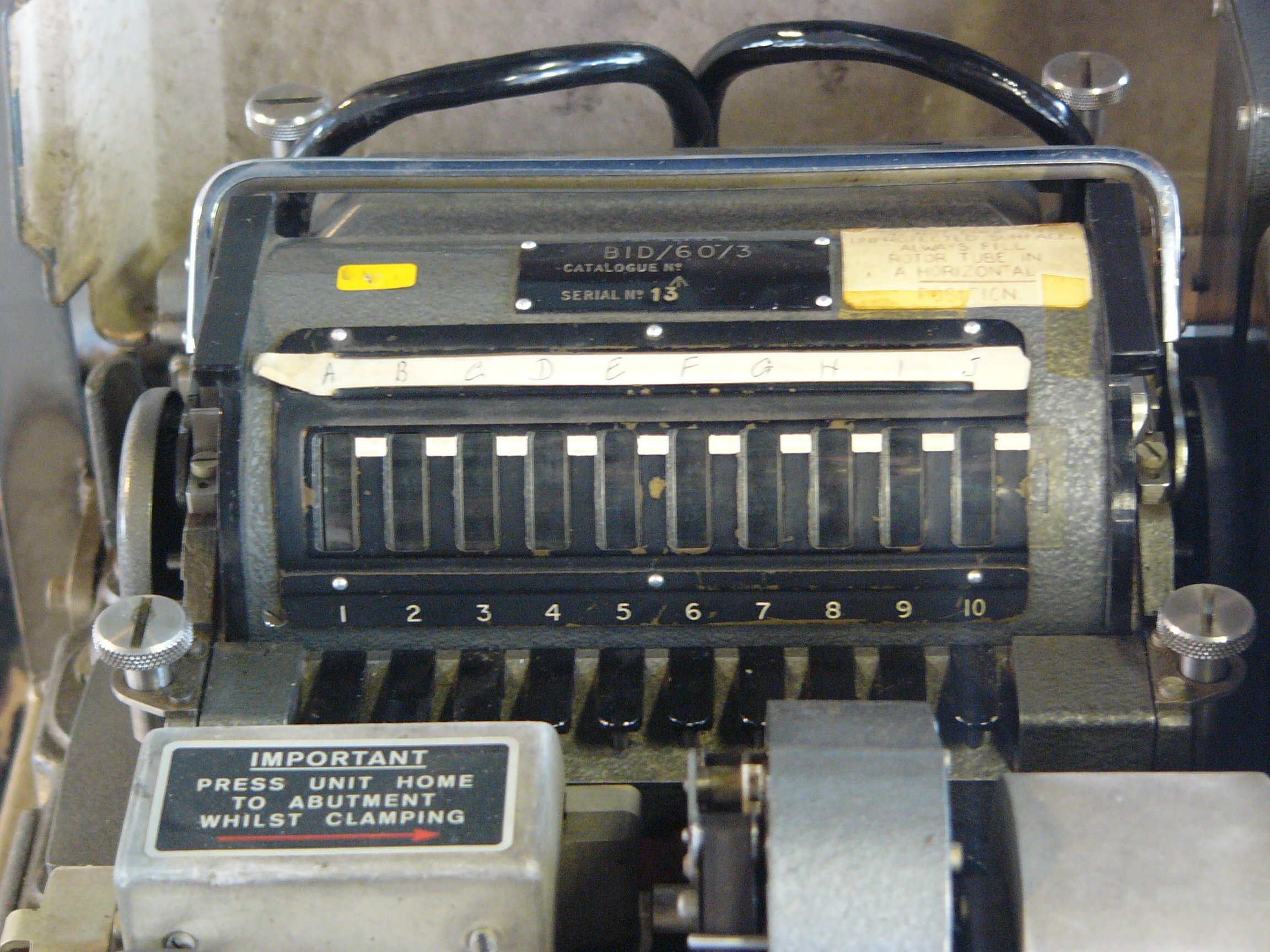
The rotor tube of a Singlet machine, with 10 windows and stepping levers (similar to those on a KL-7, suggesting 10 rotors.

In 2005, a Singlet machine was exhibited in the Enigma and Friends display at the Bletchley Park museum.
