= Combined Cipher Machine =

WWII-era Allied cipher system

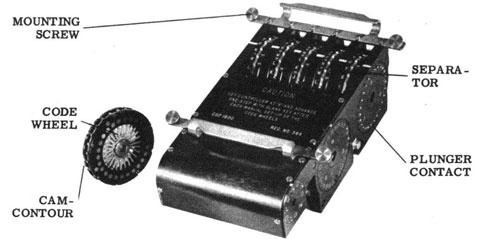
CSP 1600, the replacement stepping unit to adapt the ECM Mark II to CCM

The Combined Cipher Machine (CCM) (or Combined Cypher Machine) was a common cipher machine system for securing Allied communications during World War II and, for a few years after, by NATO. The British Typex machine and the US ECM Mark II were both modified so that they were interoperable.

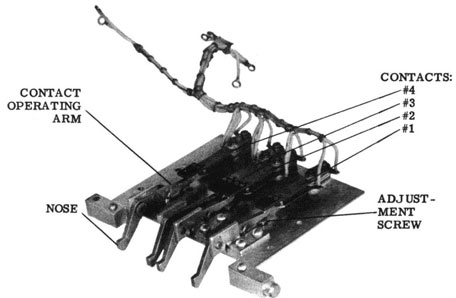
Stepping mechanism in the CSP 1600

== History ==
The British had shown their main cipher machine — Typex — to the US on their entry into the war, but the Americans were reluctant to share their machine, the ECM Mark II. There was a need for secure inter-Allied communications, and so a joint cipher machine adapted from both countries' systems was developed by the US Navy.

== Use ==
The "Combined Cipher Machine" was approved in October 1942, and production began two months later. The requisite adapters, designed by Don Seiler, were all manufactured in the US, as Britain did not have sufficient manufacturing resources at the time. The CCM was initially used on a small scale for naval use from 1 November 1943, becoming operational on all US and UK armed services in April 1944.

The adapter to convert the ECM into the CCM was denoted the ASAM 5 by the US Army (in 1949) and CSP 1600 by the US Navy (the Navy referred to the entire ECM machine with CCM adapter as the CSP 1700). The adapter was a replacement rotor basket, so the ECM could be easily converted for CCM use in the field. A specially converted ECM, termed the CCM Mark II, was also made available to Britain and Canada.

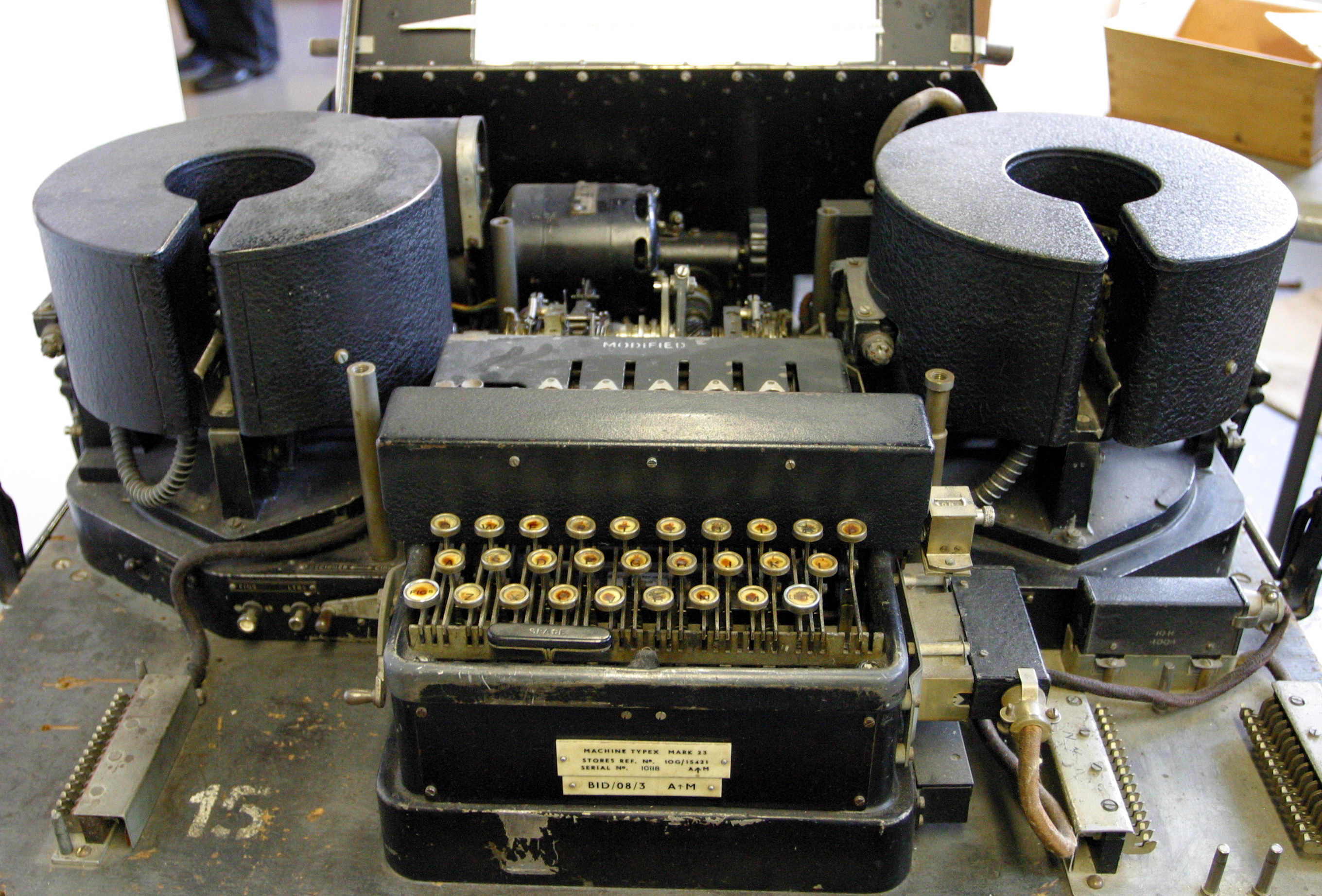
Typex Mark 23, pictured, was similar to the Mark 22, but modified for use with the Combined Cypher Machine (CCM).

The CCM programme cost US$6 million.

SIGROD was an implementation of the CCM which, at one point, was proposed as a replacement for the ECM Mark II (Savard and Pekelney, 1999).

TypeX Mark 23 was a later model of the Typex cipher machine family that was adapted for use with the Combined Cipher Machine.

== Security ==
While Allied codebreakers had much success reading the equivalent German machine, the Lorenz cipher, their German counterparts, although performing some initial analysis, had no success with the CCM.

However, there were security problems with the CCM. It was discovered that certain rotor combinations produced a dangerously short period of 338; a three-rotor Enigma machine had a period of 16,900. In addition, the rotor wiring could be recovered from a 1,000-group message that had been sent using the machine.

In 1952, a later version of CCM, "Ajax", was also found to have security problems.

== See also ==
- KL-7 – a rotor-based cipher machine used by the US in the 1950s and 1960s
