= C-52 (cipher machine) =

1950s cipher machines by Crypto AG

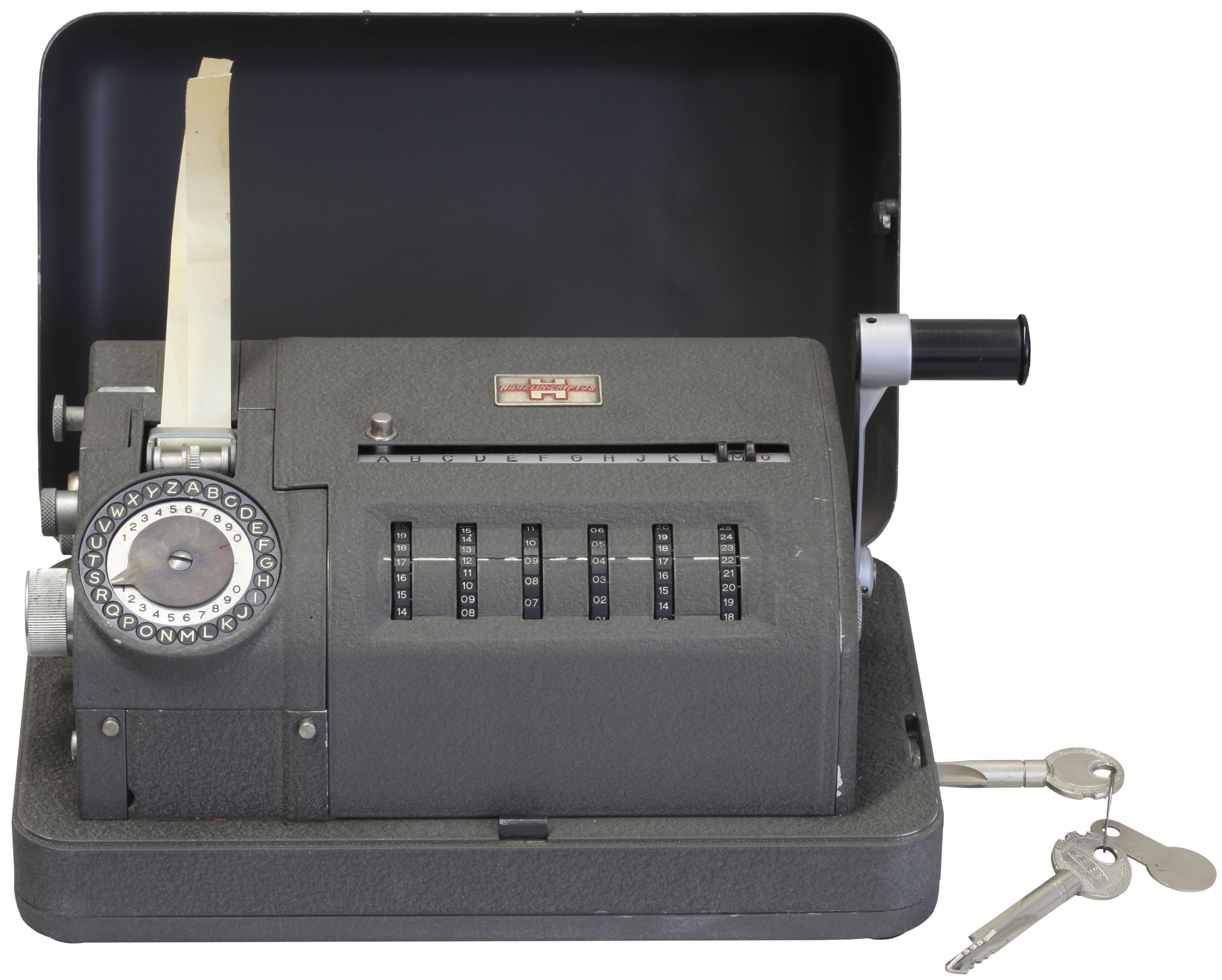
The CX-52

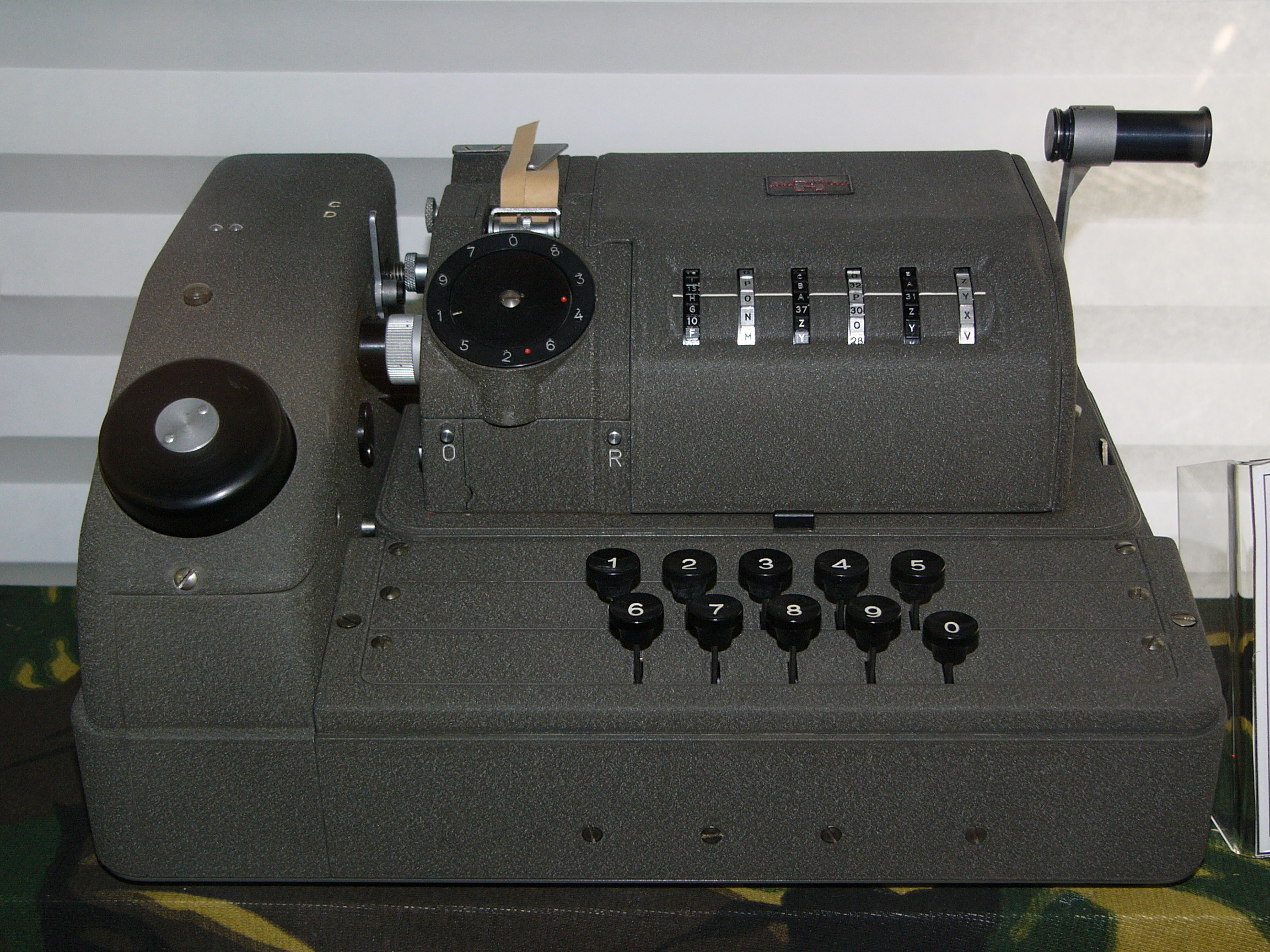
A combination of a C-52 cipher machine with a B-52 keyboard attachment, such as pictured here, was denoted the BC-52.

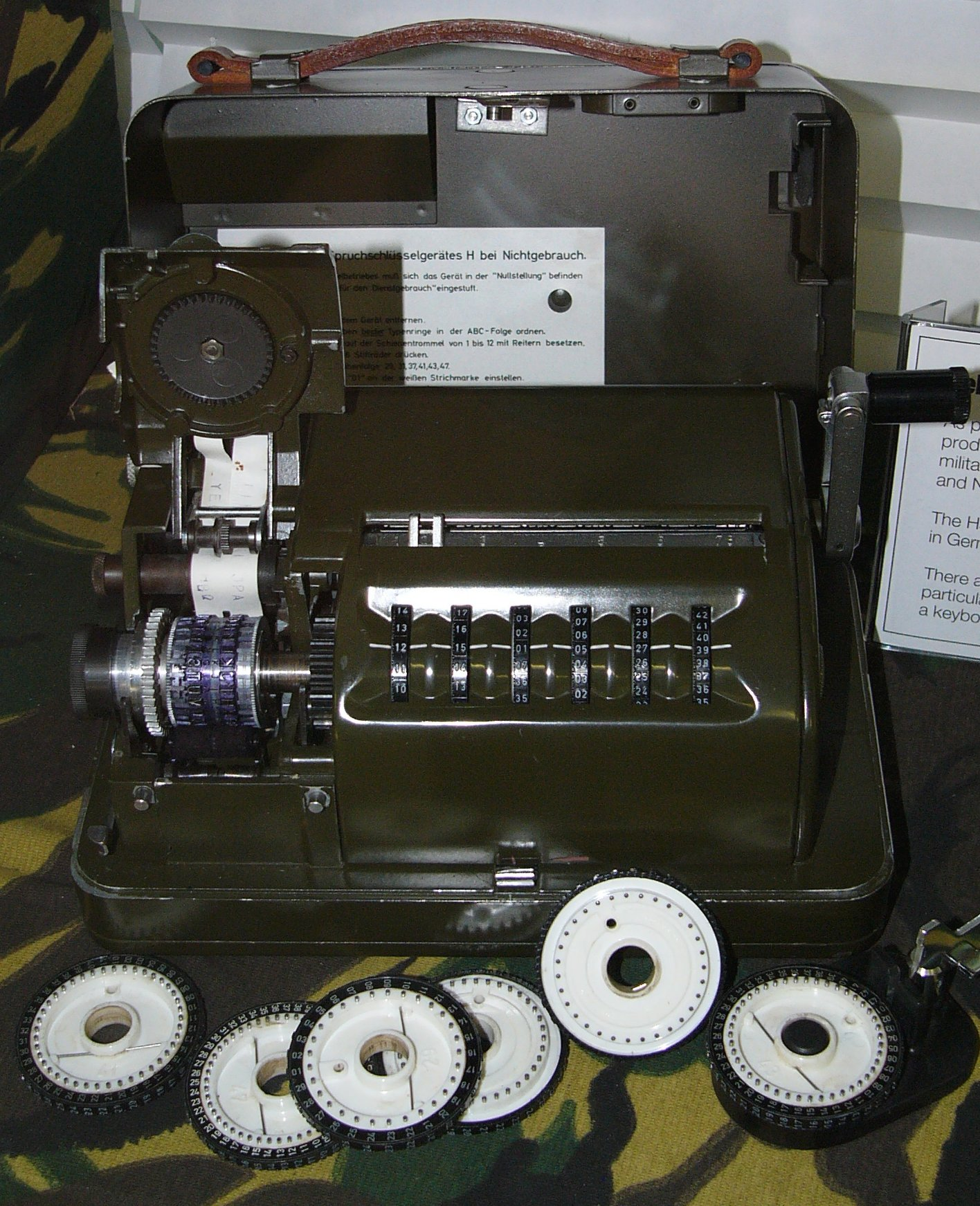
A Hell 54, a licensed German copy of the C-52

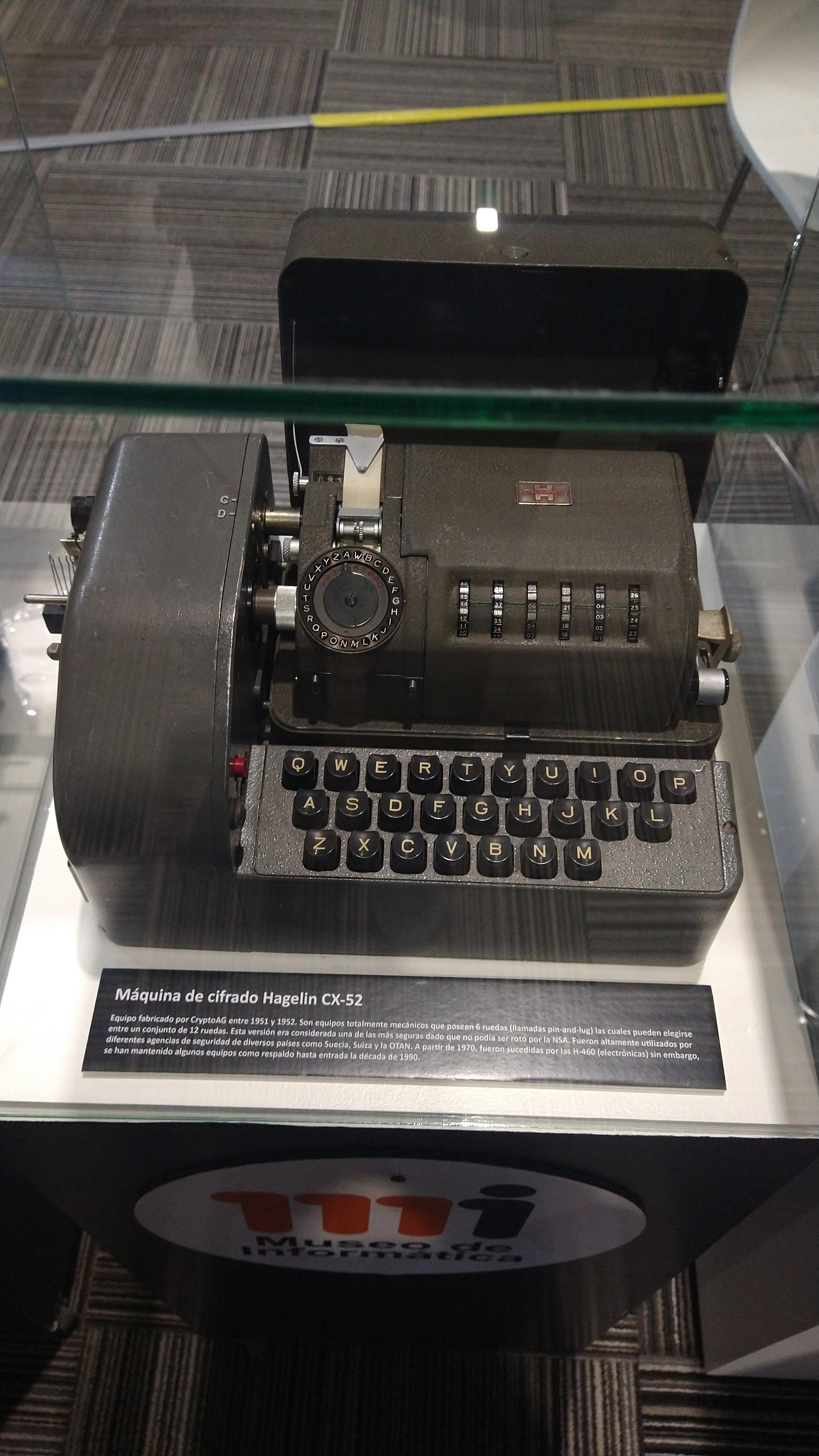
Hagelin CX-52 from the Argentine Computer Museum, exhibited at Ekoparty 2023

The (Hagelin) C-52 and CX-52 were cipher machines manufactured by Crypto AG starting 1951/1952. These pin-and-lug type cipher machines were advanced successors of the C-38/M-209. The machine measures 8 1/2 by 5 3/8 by 4 3/8 inches (22 cm × 14 cm × 11 cm). The device is mechanical, but when combined with an electric keyboard attachment, the B-52, the resultant system is termed the BC-52. The B-52 is larger, measuring 12 1/2 by 8 1/2 by 6 3/8 inches (32 cm × 22 cm × 16 cm).

The Hell 54 was a licensed copy of the C-52 by German company Hell.

== Structure and operation ==
Both C and CX models are equipped with six pinwheels. In the C-52 version, these six wheels are chosen from a possible set of 12, with the number of pins on each wheel being 25, 26, 29, 31, 34, 37, 38, 41, 42, 43, 46, and 47. The C model had a fixed stepping system with a large wheel cycle due to the mutually prime factors in the pin counts. The CX-52 version has 6 pinwheels with 47 pins each and a flexible wheel movement system. The lug cage of both models contains 32 movable bars: 27 of the bars are used for encryption and the remaining 5 bars control the stepping of the pinwheels. The early CX models used the control bars also for encryption but due to complications in creating acceptable lug settings later CX models used these bars only for controlling of the wheel stepping. The stepping of the CX wheels was controlled by adjustable lugs on the control bars.

The C-52 and CX-52 were very flexible machines that could be produced in various ways, creating a unique machine with unique cryptographic characteristics for each customer. There were special detachable wheel movement bars and their position on the drum could change, interchangeable print wheels, custom pinwheel labels, versions with One-time Tape reader instead of wheels, versions that only enciphered numbers, and many other details that influenced the enciphering process.

== Breaking and compromising ==
There is some speculation that the CX-52 might have been broken by the signals intelligence services of Communist East Germany, Czechoslovakia, and Poland.

Many of the C-52 and CX-52 machines sold by Crypto AG were compromised to benefit the US and British national signals intelligence agencies, National Security Agency (NSA) and Government Communications Headquarters (GCHQ), respectively. For details, see Crypto AG § Compromised machines.

== See also ==
- Operation Rubicon
- M-209
- C-36 (cipher machine)
- CD-57
