= Boris Hagelin =

Swedish businessman and inventor (1892–1983)

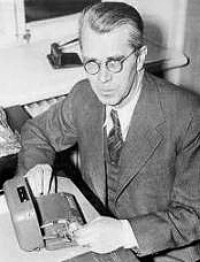
- Born: Boris Caesar Wilhelm Hagelin; 2 July 1892
- Died: 7 September 1983 (aged 91)
- Occupations: Businessman, inventor
- Father: Karl Wilhelm Hagelin
- Relatives: Carl Hagelin (great-grandson)

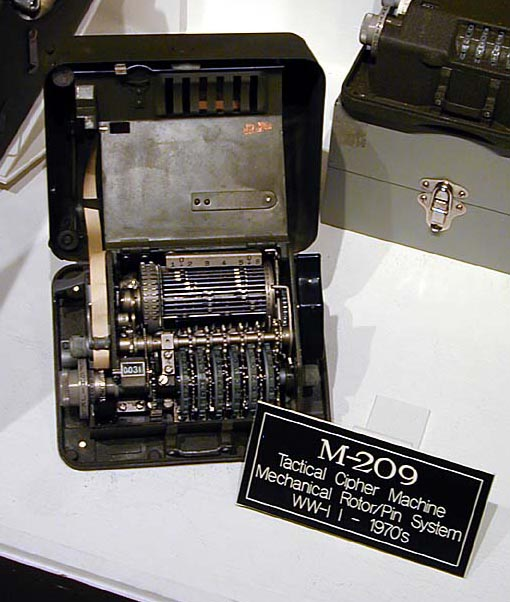
An M-209 designed by Hagelin

Boris Caesar Wilhelm Hagelin (2 July 1892 – 7 September 1983) was a Swedish businessman and inventor of encryption machines.

== Biography ==
Born of Swedish parents in Adshikent, Russian Empire (now Azerbaijan), Hagelin attended Lundsberg boarding school and later studied mechanical engineering at the Royal Institute of Technology in Stockholm, graduating in 1914. He gained experience in engineering through work in Sweden and the United States.

His father Karl Wilhelm Hagelin worked for Nobel in Baku (part of the Russian Empire at the time), but the family returned to Sweden after the Russian Revolution. Karl Wilhelm was an investor in Arvid Gerhard Damm's company Aktiebolaget Cryptograph, established to sell rotor machines built using Damm's 1919 patent. Boris Hagelin was placed in the firm to represent the family investment. In 1925, Hagelin took over the firm, later reorganising it as Aktiebolaget Cryptoteknik in 1932. His machines competed with Scherbius' Enigma machines, but sold rather better.

At the beginning of World War II, Hagelin moved from Sweden to Switzerland, all the way across Germany and through Berlin to Geneva, carrying the design documents for the company's latest machine, and re-established his company there. That design was small, cheap and moderately secure, and he convinced the US military to adopt it. Many tens of thousands of them were made, and Hagelin became quite wealthy as a result. After his company, Crypto AG, was secretly sold to foreign intelligence agencies (the American CIA and German BND) in 1970, it fraudulently sold compromised machines to a variety of customers, including governments. Historian David Kahn has suggested that Hagelin was the only cypher-machine maker who ever became a millionaire.

Boris is the great-grandfather of Carl Hagelin, former NHL player for the Washington Capitals.

== Patents ==
- U.S. patent 1,846,105
- U.S. patent 2,089,603 (C-35)
- U.S. patent 2,247,170
- U.S. patent 2,802,047
- U.S. patent 2,851,794 (CD-57)
- U.S. patent 3,083,263
- U.S. patent 3,485,948

== See also ==
- C-36 (cipher machine)
- M-209
- C-52 (cipher machine)
