= Cryptograph =

Swedish cryptography company

- Industry: Cipher machines
- Founded: July 21, 1916 in Sweden
- Founders: Olof Gyldén; Arvid Gerhard Damm
- Defunct: 1930
- Fate: Dissolved
- Successors: Ingeniörsfirman Teknik; Cryptoteknik; Crypto AG
- Headquarters: Sweden
- Key people: Emanuel Nobel; Boris Hagelin
- Products: B-21 cipher machine

AB Cryptograph was a limited Swedish company developing and selling crypto machines, founded on 21 July 1916 and liquidated in 1930. It was probably the first company in the world to focus entirely on the cryptographic market.

In December 1914, two Swedes; Olof Gyldén, a navy officer with an interest in cryptography; and Arvid Gerhard Damm, a Swedish engineer and inventor, met in Berlin to discuss Damm's ideas for a new type of crypto machine. Impressed, Gyldén managed to interest a group of Swedish businessmen to invest in a project to exploit Damm's ideas commercially. A patent consortium, Cryptograph, was founded in June 1915. A year later, a shareholding company with the same name was established with Gyldén as chairman and CEO. Damm was given the position of engineer and was also a shareholder.

Expectations were great and sales estimated at more than 50 desktop machines and 500 handheld devices per year. However, actual sales were far below these numbers, and although Damm made inventions and designed new machines, the financial situation deteriorated. With the infusion of new money, primarily from Emanuel Nobel in 1922, the company was kept alive and machines continued to be produced, but success proved elusive.

In 1922, Boris Hagelin was employed as controller, and in 1925 he was in charge of the company. He was the son of K W Hagelin, a close associate of Emanuel Nobel. In 1928, in competition with the Zählwerk Enigma he managed to secure an order from the Swedish General Staff for a newly developed machine, the B-21. It was based on the ideas of Damm's B-13, but equipped with a battery and an Enigma style lamp field.

In 1930, the Cryptograph company was terminated with all patent rights transferred to Boris Hagelin's company Ingeniörsfirman Teknik which in turn was renamed Cryptoteknik in 1939. It stayed in business until 1958 when all activities were transferred to Boris Hagelin's Swiss company Crypto AG, founded in 1952.
