= CD-57 =

Mechanical cipher machine

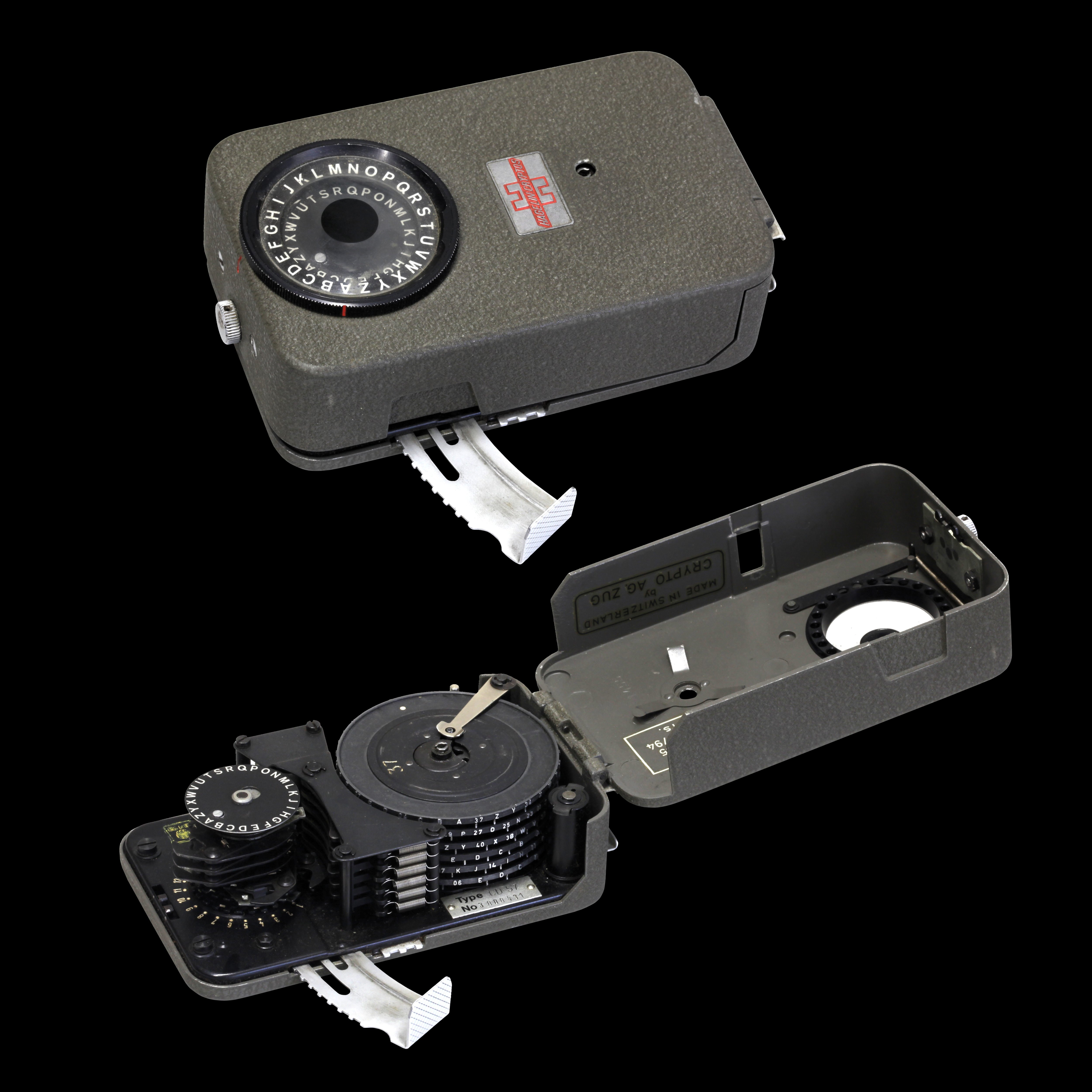

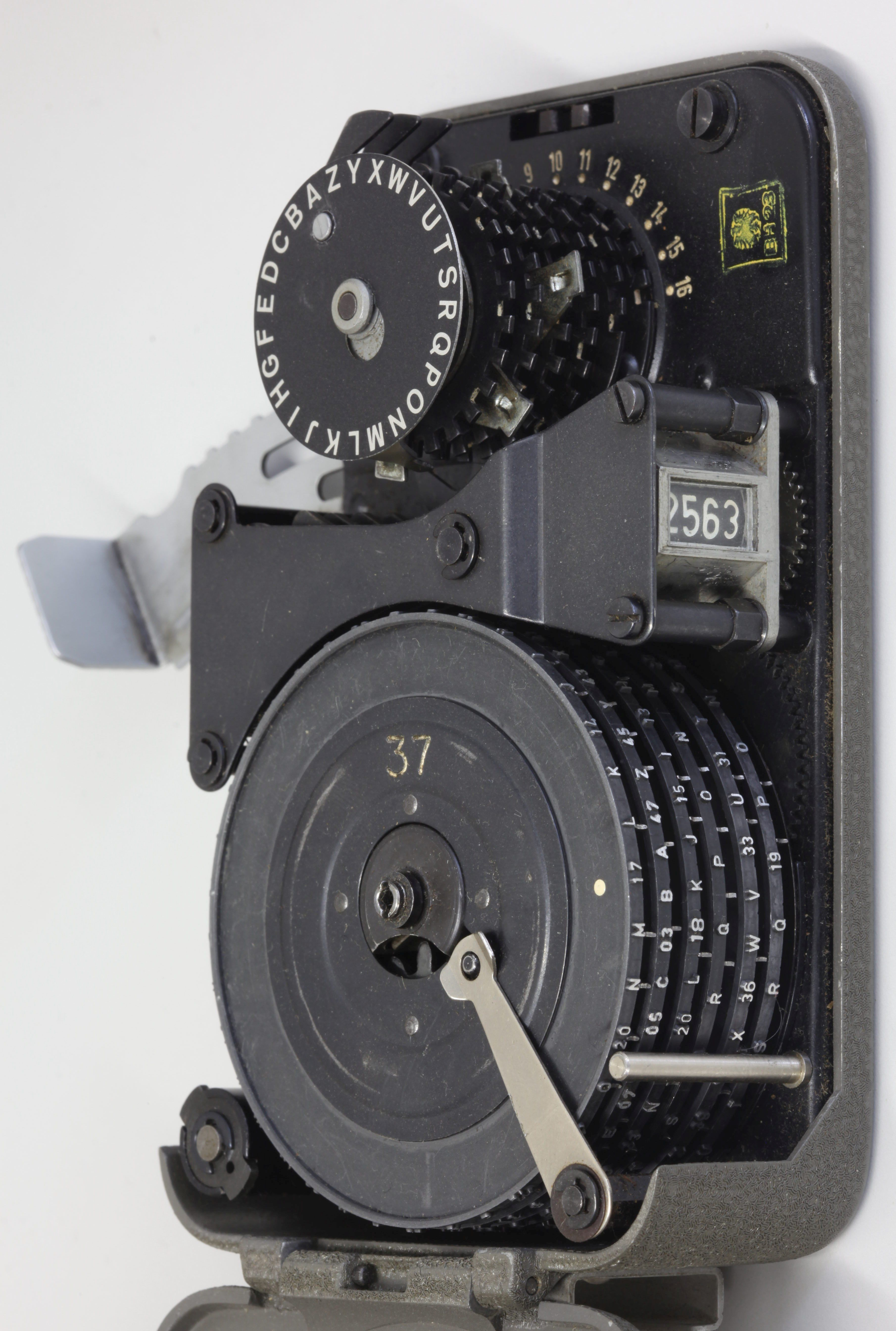
Opened CD-57

The (Hagelin) CD-57 was a portable, mechanical cipher machine manufactured by Crypto AG, first produced in 1957. It was derived from the earlier CD-55, and was designed to be compatible with the larger C-52 machines. Compact, the CD-57 measured merely 5 1/8in × 3 1/8in × 1 1/2in (13 × 8 × 3.8 cm) and weighed 1.5 pounds (680 gr). The CD-57 used six wheels.

A variant is the CD-57(RT), a similar device using a one-time pad system rather than rotating wheels. The STG-61 was a licensed copy of the CD-57 by Hell.

Sullivan (2002) shows how the CD-57 can be attacked using a hill climbing search technique.

== See also ==
- M-209
