= C-36 (cipher machine) =

1930s invention by Swede Boris Hagelin

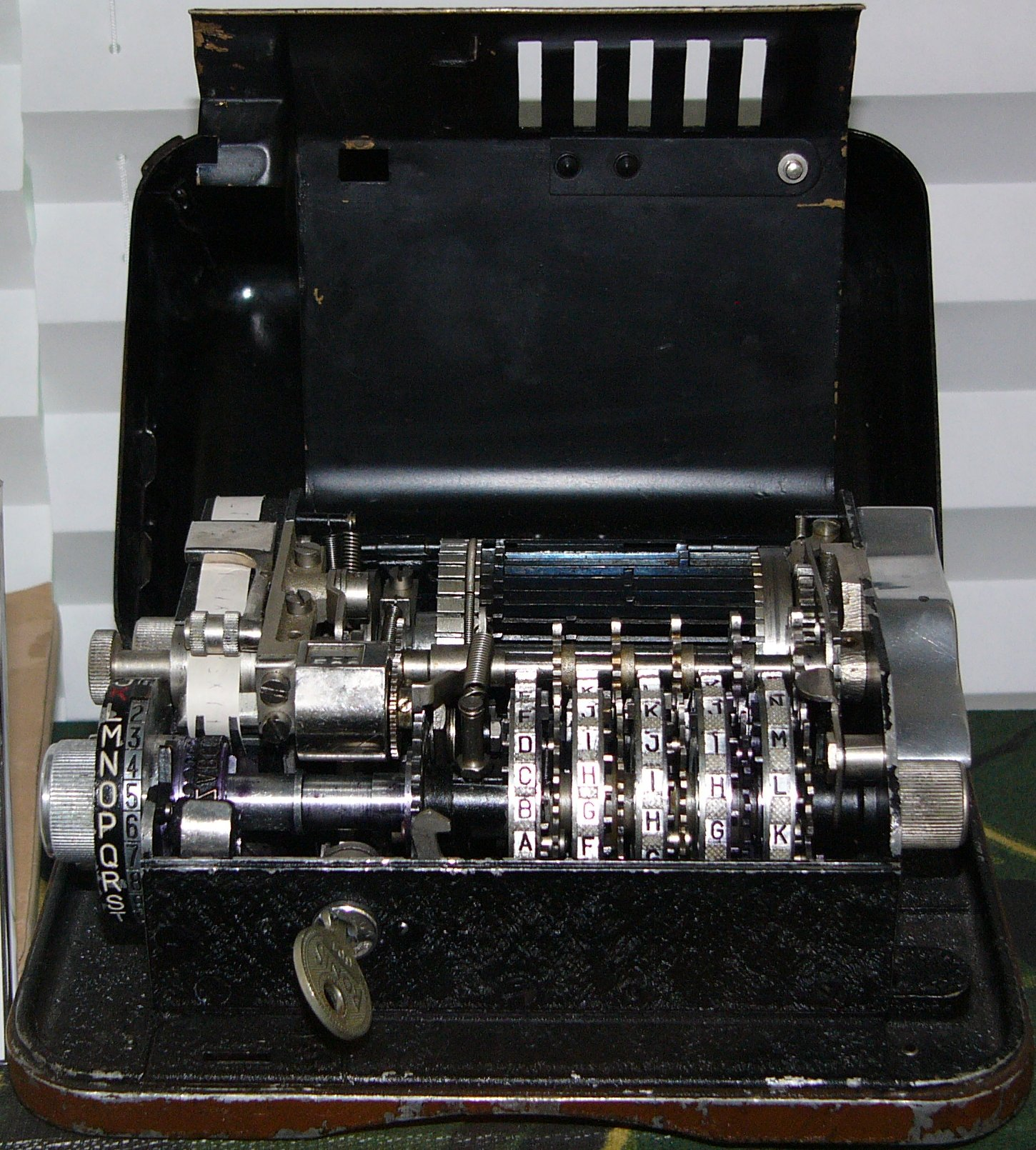
A C-36 on display at Bletchley Park museum

The C-35 and C-36 were cipher machines designed by Swedish cryptographer Boris Hagelin in the 1930s. These were the first of Hagelin's cipher machines to feature the pin-and-lug mechanism. A later machine in the same series, the C-38, was designated CSP-1500 by the United States Navy and M-209 by the United States military, who used it extensively.

In 1934, the French military approached Hagelin to design a printing, pocket-size cipher machine; Hagelin carved a piece of wood to outline the dimensions of a machine that would fit into a pocket. He adapted one of his previous inventions from three years earlier: an adding device designed for use in vending machines, and combined it with the pinwheel mechanism from a late 1920s cipher machine Hagelin had developed. The French ordered 5,000 in 1935. Italy and the USA declined the machine, although both would later use the M-209 / C-38. Completely mechanical, the C-35 machine measured 150 by 115 by 50 millimetres (6 in × 4 1/2 in × 2 in), and weighed less than 1.5 kilograms (3 lb).

A revised machine, the C-36, was similar to the C-35, but had a different distribution of the lugs on the bars. Six C-36 machines were purchased by the Swedish Navy for testing in October 1937. Both machines had five pinwheels with 17, 19, 21, 23 and 25 pins, each individually settable, giving a maximum period of 3,900,225 for the machine. The C-362 revision included a few other improvements, most notably movable lugs instead of fixed. One variant had a Thai alphabet on the pinwheels, rather than the usual Latin alphabet.
