= Otto Buggisch =

German mathematician (1910–1991)

Otto Buggisch (28 June 1910 – 15 September 1991) was a German mathematician who, during World War II, was a cryptanalyst working in the cipher bureau, the Cipher Department of the High Command of the Wehrmacht (OKW/Chi) responsible for deciphering of the opposing forces Communications. He also dealt with the security control of own key procedures. Through research and revelations exposed by two Polish officers, late in the war, he recognized the true cryptographic weaknesses of the Enigma rotor cipher, key machine used by the German armed forces to encrypt their secret communications, in World War II.

== Life ==
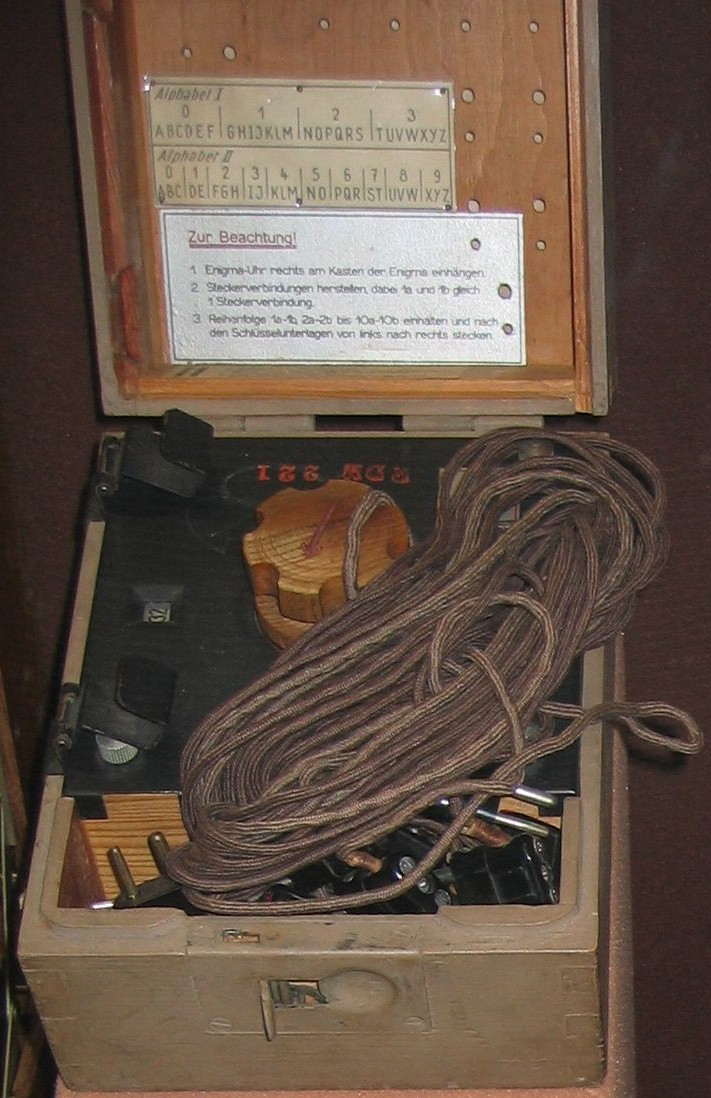
Toward the end of the war in July 1944, the Luftwaffe introduced the clock or Enigma-uhr to cryptographically strengthen the Enigma I.

Buggisch graduated from the Ludwig-Georgs Gymnasium (LGG) in Darmstadt in 1928. He studied pure mathematics and physics and the subsidiary subject applied mathematics at the Technische Universität Darmstadt.

In 1938, Buggisch was promoted to Dr. rer. nat. with a mathematical dissertation titled On the Rarity of Equations with Affect (German: Über die Seltenheit der Gleichungen mit Affekt) which was supervised by Udo Wegner at the Technische Universität Darmstadt.

During the war, Buggisch held the military rank of a sergeant in group 7/VI at OKW/Chi.

== Military career ==
=== 1940 ===
From May 1940 to July 40, Buggisch was posted to a Wireless Telegraphy (abbr. W/T) Listening Interpretation Station (colloquially Out-Station or Intercept station) of Army Group C in Bad Schwalbach, Bad Kreuznach, Saarbrücken. Buggisch was subordinated to Hauptmann Walter Mettig, a signals officer, who became second-in-command of OKW/Chi. Together with his colleague, the mathematician, Wolfgang Franz, they initially worked on French Army cipher systems before and during the Battle of France. These were the F90, F110 ciphers, known by their German designations and were based on 4-figure codes. In one case the recipher consisted of a periodic adder, or subtractor of length 11. In the other, it was ordinary transposition, the transposition key being obtained from a key word which itself was taken from the code and shown by an indicator group. Both systems were being read from the winter of 1939 to the end of the Battle of France in June 1940. Buggisch also worked on analysing the diagonal write-out transposition (Transposition cipher), C-36 cipher machine These were simple field codes. From 20 July 1940, he was posted and attached to an intercept station in Berlin at 29/30 Bendlerstrasse, where there were other specialist sections for interception of Russian and Balkan traffic. During this period, he undertook the completion of two works on the C-36 Cipher machine, while working with the team which included Erich Hüttenhain, the chief cryptanalyst of OKW/Chi and Fritz Menzer, the hand and machine cipher designer and inventor. Buggisch also studied the M40 device, designed by Fritz Menzer, finding it moderately secure but it was never actually used. The M40 device was the forerunner of the Cipher Machine 41 (German: Schlüsselgerät 41), but the motion of the wheels was found to be not so irregular.

During September 1940, Buggisch was transferred to a Soviet (Russian) specialist section. They worked on a 4-figure code (Olowo) and 5-figure codes, creating practice messages. In October or November 1940, Buggisch transferred to an intercept station in France.

=== 1941 ===
In January 1941, he was transferred to the Balkans specialist section that was directed by Rudolf Bailovic. Buggisch worked on the Greek 5-figure transposition cipher. Two memoranda were issued concerning the JUGO – SLAV code.

Around 1 February 1941, all cryptanlysts including Buggisch were transferred from the Intercept station to the Inspectorate 7 unit, later called the General der Nachrichtenaufklärung.

In June 1941, Buggisch moved to the newly formed Signals Recce Abteilung (abbr. Signals), with all personnel who worked in In 7/VI being subordinated into that unit. The Russian cipher specialist section was again subordinated to the Intercept station, with the unit moving to Loetzen. Between July 1941 and November 1941, while at Loetzen, Buggisch worked on 5-figure material, specifically the OK40 code and the K37 machine. The OK40 was the official Russian designation for the Soviet (Russian) 5/F or 5-figure operational code. It contained 25,000 groups namely all the five-figure numbers and only these, in which the first three figures were all simultaneously odd or simultaneously even. For recyphering the add [subtractor] or 300 5/F groups were in general use by the Soviets. The code was used from about the end of June 1941 to September 1941, by the higher and highest Soviet Army command. Soon after the beginning of Operation Barbarossa, several copies of the code were captured along with their recypher tables but with most of them out of date by that point, with the Soviets changing them frequently, but not yet daily. Owing to the already mentioned special characteristic of the first three elements of the code groups it was particularly easy to line them up. In this way, depth of 8–12 was often obtained, so that the recipher could easily be stripped by well known methods.

The K37 was the Russian Crystal cipher machine, that worked on the same principle as the B211 cipher, but a more primitive cipher. The K37 machine was different from the B211 in lacking the (German: Surchiffreur) or German: Ueberschluesseler, a sort of Enigma wheel by which the path of the current was turned to another channel at one point, crossing over and exchanging positions with another path instead of continuing parallel. Buggisch called this the X effect, and stated it greatly complicated cryptanalysis, as it was hard to tell when it was being employed in place of the parallels.

A model was captured in 1941. Analysis by Buggisch and Herbert von Denffer found that it could be solved on a 10 letter crib. The work remained purely theoretical as no traffic from this machine was ever received.

In November 1941, Buggisch was transferred to In 7/VI in Berlin, working at the French specialist section, located at Matthekirchplatz 4. Posted there until August 1942, he worked on a variety of problems, including

- Hatted diplomatic 5-figure codes used by Charles de Gaulle
- Swiss Hagelin machine messages.

The unit included Dr Kunze of Pers Z S, working on French diagonal write-out transposition ciphers used by the de Gaulle delegation in Senegal.

=== 1942 ===
At the beginning of 1942, Buggisch's signals unit was disbanded and he was transferred to a company called 4 Company, Evaluation Company was formed with Major Mettig in command In the summer of 1942, Buggisch was working with Doering on the first detailed investigation of cypher teleprinters, the T52 models T52a to c, that were to be extensively used by the Wehrmacht. The B211 code was worked on with Denffer and Hilburg later in the summer. Buggisch worked in the section until August 1942, until a reorganization of the specialist desks of Section VI was undertaken. A few mathematicians left for Section IV of Inspectorate 7. Buggisch transferred to the newly formed cipher machine specialists section, conducting extensive investigations into Cipher Machine 41 (German: Schlüsselgerät 41). Buggisch subsequently worked on call sign's and research into the double Playfair. In November 1942, Buggisch started work into research of Cipher Machine 39 (German: Schlüsselgerät 39) that was being proposed for use by the Kriegsmarine.

By the summer of 1942, Buggisch had been assigned to work full-time on the cypher teleprinter T52 with Doering. Buggisch and Doering worked on versions a, b, c of the teleprinter, as well as the SZ40 rotor stream cipher machine. The B-211 code was studied in detail, using traffic collected from two years before. A theoretical solution to the B211 code was developed by the group and back traffic was actually solved. However, the method did not work in practice when B211 traffic was again encountered. Buggisch did not mention any other solutions.

In August 1942, Inspectorate 7/VI were again under reorganization. Buggisch was transferred to the newly formed machine specialist section. Buggisch conducted an investigation into Cypher Device 41 known as Schlüsselgerät 41. Buggisch stated that Device 41 was Fritz Menzer's idea, and the technical side was worked on by Wa Pruef 7/IV. Buggisch also worked on Call signs and weaknesses in the double Playfair cipher. In November 1942, Buggisch began research into the security of the naval version of Cypher Device 41.

=== 1943 ===
In the spring 1943, Buggisch conducted general investigations into the small technique TECHNIK Hagelin machine. The Swedish firm, A.B. Cryptograph, Stockholm produced an early type of Hagelin machine known as TEKNIK. One example of the BC 38 device was received from the Wa Pruef 7/IV unit, together with the statement that Boris Hagelin was working in America. The BC38 was a Swedish Hagelin machine. An engineer called Voss, who was a German spy in Sweden, had informed Germany that the US was planning to adopt a Hagelin idea. Buggisch and his team had investigated the Hagelin machine for security weaknesses. Buggisch also conducted research into Enigma machine 39 during this period. He also started work on a future German Standard Cypher teleprinter standard. French C36 messages appeared in the 5-figure Charles de Gaulle code traffic again, with the decoding of the work being done by means of the method developed earlier by Denffer. It was discovered to be transposed. Likewise more B-211 messages appeared but the theoretically worked out procedure did not result in a decode.

During the summer of 1943, Buggisch works with Luzius and Rudolf Kochendörffer on the Crib problem with converter 209 (M-209), which had been captured from Italy. This was the first key recovery from a crib. Major Lechner was head of Section Inspectorate 7/VI. During this period Buggisch conducted conferences with OKW/Chi regarding security studies on the BC38 device, which was the Swedish Hagelin cipher machine, on the Enigma cipher machine and on the cypher teleprinter with Karl Stein and with Gisbert Hasenjaeger. During the summer Buggisch worked on and broke the Croatian Enigma. From about August 1943, Buggisch worked on a captured specimen of converter 209 from Italy. During the course of 1943, the Inspectorate 7/VI was renamed to the Signal Intelligence Section of the Department of signals of the General Army Office (German: Amtsgruppe Nachrichten/Nachrichten Aufklaerun). In October 1943, the office moved to Jüterbog. In the winter of 1943, Buggisch worked with Doering, whose specialty was also machine ciphers, on Russian cypher teleprinters, i.e. the Russian Fish device, cribs and supposed results of the device from the Forschungsamt. He also worked on the Enigma specifically crib problems, Bigram systems. On the Converted 209, he worked on column separation (German: Spaltentren-nung). He also conducted continued research on the C36 messages, looking at messages with complicated enciphering techniques, which were solved in the spring. Later, he conducted lectures on theory, specifically discussing depth problems, X^{2} and W^{2} methods.

Towards the end of the year, in November 1943, Buggisch had a discussion with Korvettenkapitän Jaeckle. He has become acquainted with Jaeckle in 1943, when Jaeckle who was an ordinary Naval Signals Officer, had managed to get hold of a model of the M-209 cipher device and had worked out a solution while sitting idle in a French port. The solution was, in fact, childish and consisted of nothing more than a study of the theoretical working equation of the machine. Jaeckle had talked his way into the SKL and had talked a lot about getting a section of 200 men to work on the machine. Actually he had been exposed quickly and had been sent back to sea after three or four months. Buggisch considered this a very foolish incident altogether.

=== 1944 ===
In the first two months of 1944, Buggisch conducted discussions with colleagues on cypher problems and the teleprinter T43, which was the new secure model first discussed in spring 1943 while he was staying in Köthen During the first half of 1944, he conducted research into the weaknesses of the Naval Emergency Key along with Kapitän zur See, Captain at sea Beegemann and Fregattenkapitän Frigate captain Singer. He studied the Army Enigma, looking for weaknesses in that system. He examined the machine, and specifically looked for compromise of the key through message settings and looked at the question of the possibility in principle of breaking cyphers by means of statistical analysis on enormous amounts of machinery to drive

During this period Buggisch's team conducted research into the field-rewirable reflector, (German: Umkehrwalze D) which lead to the Enigma Uhr device. Another device which was created to increase the security of Enigma was the Lückenfüllerwalze, or gap-filling wheel, that was built by Fritz Menzer. This was a device for varying turnover of wheels by means of adjustable plugs on the perimeter.

The effort to improve the Enigma was a result of the implications of what was known Der Fall Wicher or Case Wicher. This was German knowledge, or supposed knowledge, that the Enigma cipher machine and therefore its own key processes, were not secure and had already been read by the Allies. The Fall Wicher was the knowledge that was received from two Polish officers being held in a concentration camp who had been captured in France in 1940. The two officers had been repeatedly interviewed in the intervening years of the war and revealed nothing to their German interrogators. Finally, in late 1943, early 1944 when the war had turned against Germany they had volunteered the information that the Enigma device had been broken by Polish cryptanalysts several years before the war, confirming German suspicions.

=== Mid 1944 to April 1945 ===
During this period Buggisch was attached to the Communications Experimental Station, located in a cave in Staats. The station was part of the Army Ordnance Branch, department WA Pruef 7, Section IV, Referat A from June 1944. He worked on the mathematical treatment of ciphony systems. During this period Buggisch also worked almost exclusively on Russian X^{2} ciphony device. He also worked on the T52 teleprinter frequency Undulator device. Later work was the theoretical investigations into the construction of Tigerstedt keys, from a cryptographic device constructed by Eric Tigerstedt.

=== Autumn 1944 ===
In Autumn, Buggisch's attachment to WA Pruef 7 was suspended, and he was transferred from AgN/NA to OKW/Chi Chi IV Analytical Cryptography (German: Analytical cryptanalysis). This move was specifically designed to enable him to attend the Chi conference in Berlin at the instigation of Major General Wilhelm Gimmler, (German: Chef Ag WNV). Gimmler was the Chief Signals Officer and Chief of the Armed Forces Signal Communications Office. The Chi conference took place over a period of three months from November 1944 through January 1945. Gimmler had insisted on them, although the mathematician Erich Hüttenhain who also worked an OKW/Chi, was against them, and felt it was a waste of time to gather formally to hear reports. In spite of this, Hüttenhain held the chair at these conferences. Four different subjects were covered, with a day allotted to each. These were:

- Speech encipherment.
- Security of Teleprinters.
- Security of the Enigma cipher machine.
- Security of Hand systems.

Buggisch attended only the first session.

=== January 1945 ===
In January 1945, Buggisch conducted three lectures, on ciphony, at the OKW/Chi. This was followed by a visit to the town of Ebermannstadt, and the Feuerstein Castle laboratory, to become acquainted with the proposed German ciphony systems.

=== March 1945 ===
Buggisch worked to determine the theoretical foundations of an Allied ciphony apparatus from the captured Mustang a/c restored to working order by the German Aeronautical Research Institute by engineer Vegemund, who described its working to Buggisch. The investigations begun at Wa Pruef 7/IVe could not be carried very far owing to the general disorganization then beginning and the fall of Germany.

== After World War II ==
Before the war, he taught at the Old Realgymnasium Darmstadt (1938) and at the Stefan George Gymnasium in Bingen (1938–39). In May 1939, he was first called to the pioneers. Although not a member of the Nazi party, in 1943, he was appointed as a secondary school teacher (German:Studienrat) [possibly to teach the children of Nazi officials] that was held during his military service. In April 1946 he was released from prison. From 1948 to 1966, he taught at the Ludwig-Georgs-Gymnasium, the preparatory course for foreign students in Darmstadt (1966–1969), and finally as a postgraduate student at the Mathematics Institute of the TH-Darmstadt (1969–1972).

== TICOM homework ==
Immediately after the war, he was interviewed extensively by the interrogators of the Target Intelligence Committee (TICOM) regarding his work. A large part of the available information about him and his activity comes from these interrogations. These investigations were originally classified as TOP SECRET, but with the passing of time they can now be viewed publicly.

Otto Buggisch wrote homework, specifically a report for TICOM that described in detail, the Schlüsselgerät 39 device and the use of Hollerith and other specialist machinery in the solution of Hagelin traffic.

== TICOM publications ==
Otto Buggisch is mentioned in the following TICOM documents:

- "TICOM I-58 Interrogation of Dr Otto Buggisch of OKW/Chi 8th August 1945" (PDF). TICOM.
- "TICOM I-46 Preliminary Investigation of Wachtmeister Dr Otto Buggisch (of OKH/Gen. d. NA) and Dr Werner Liebknecht (employed by OKH and OKW as tester of cryptographic equipment) 23rd June 1945" (PDF). TICOM.
- "TICOM I-64 Answers by Wm. Buggisch sent by TICOM 8th August 1945" (PDF). TICOM.
- "TICOM I-66 Paper by Dr Otto Buggisch of OKH/In. 7/VI and OKW/Chi on Typex 12 August 1945" (PDF). TICOM.
- "TICOM I-67 Paper by Dr Otto Buggisch of OKH/In. 7/VI and OKW/Chi on Cryptanalytic Machines 13 August 1945" (PDF). TICOM.
