= Staats (disambiguation) =

Staats is a surname and given name.

Staats may also refer to:

- Staats, Saxony-Anhalt, German village
- Staats House (disambiguation), name of several buildings in the U.S.
- Hofje van Staats, hofje in the Netherlands
- Staats Island, uninhabited island in the Falkland Islands
