= Hans Pietsch (mathematician) =

German mathematician

Hans Karl Georg Heinrich Pietsch (22 November 1907 – 14 October 1967) was a German mathematician who was most notable for being a director of the Mathematical Referat of the Wehrmacht signals intelligence agency, the General der Nachrichtenaufklärung during World War II.

== Life ==
In 1938, Pietsch was promoted to Dr Phil with a doctoral dissertation titled: Areas that have a bundle of closed geodesic or a pair of conjugated counterparts (German:Über Flächen, die ein Bündel geschlossener Geodätischer oder ein Paar konjugierter Gegenpunkte besitzen), achieving a rerum naturalium at Humboldt University of Berlin. His doctoral advisor was Ludwig Bieberbach, the mathematician and nazi.

== Career ==
In 1930 Pietsch was appointed to the mathematical review journal, Jahrbuch über die Fortschritte der Mathematik and held the position until the start of World War II.

On 22 November 1939, Pietsch was conscripted into the Wehrmacht as a mathematician and was ordered to report to Inspectorate 7/VI (abbr. Insp 7/IV), the signals intelligence agency Wehrmacht with the rank of specialist. Pietsch was assigned to the Army Signal Security Agency Referat IV of Insp 7/IV along with about a dozen other mathematicians that included several actuarial mathematicians. This included the mathematicians Herbert von Denffer, Friedrich Böhm and Hans-Peter Luzius. Referat IV dealt with analytical research, specifically security of own process and this included distribution of keys and security of the Enigma and security of hand ciphers and associated procedures.

By late 1940, the organisational layout of Inspectorate 7/VI was found insufficient to handle the ever-increasing amounts of intercept traffic and a plan was formulated to reorganise the unit. In January 1941, the new unit, called Inspectorate 7/VI, became operational. Pietsch was assigned to both Referat 1 as deputy director with Steinberg as director and Referat 7 with Pietsch as deputy director with Friedrich Böhm as director.

On 1 October 1941, Pietsch was promoted to Special leader (German: Sonderführer) and then, on 1 April 1942, to Staff Sergeant (German: Unteroffizier) and left the German army with the rank of Baurat, a senior service rank in the German civil service.

At the end of 1942, all the Referats were combined into two super Referats or Hauptreferats with the first one being called A for languages that was directed by Rudolf Bailovic and the second Hauptreferats B for the mathematical section that was directed by Pietsch.

At the end of the war, Pietsch was interned at Civilian Internment Camp No. 6 in Moosburg, along with several of his colleagues, including Johannes Marquart, where he remained until June 1946 without being interrogated about his work. When he left the internment camp, Pietsch returned to work as an editor, gaining employment at the Jahrbuch über die Fortschritte der Mathematik and the East German Academy of Sciences in East Germany, and he maintained these positions until he died in 1967.

=== Case Wicher ===
After the Invasion of Poland, Pietsch, along with another cryptanalyst, Walter Fricke, interviewed a group of captured Polish cryptanalysts to ascertain whether the Polish cryptographic agency had managed to cryptanalyse the Enigma. The subsequent interviews and the whole wartime episode became known as Case Wicher. and rested upon the discovery of a solved Enigma message that had been discovered in the Cryptanalytic Bureau Wicher organisation in Warsaw, Poland in 1939. This was an Enigma message that had been transmitted from a German cruiser in Spanish waters during the Spanish Civil War and had been transmitted using the officers cipher. Pietsch along with Bohm and Steinberg played an important role in conducting security studies into the Enigma that resulted from Case Wicher in the years that followed the discovery of the solved message. Two specific instances of studies leading to action were demonstrated. The first was the discovery that double encipherment of the indicator was a serious insecurity in the use of the Enigma. As a result, on 1 May 1940, nine days before the beginning of the western campaign, in army and air force, the key procedure was radically changed for the Army and Luftwaffe Enigma machines. The second in 1944 was when Pietsch recommended that the Enigma daily use should be set below 20000 letters of use a day.

== Bibliography ==
- Pietsch, Hans. "Geodätische Approximation einer topologischen Triangulation" [Geodetic approximation of a topological triangulation]. Deutsche Mathematik (in German). 4. Leipzig: Hirzel: 583–589. Zbl 0021.35301.
- Pietsch, Hans (1938). "Über Flächen, die ein Büschel geschlossener geodätischer oder ein Paar konjugierter Gegenpunkte besitzen" [About surfaces that have a clump of closed geodesic or a pair of conjugate counterpoints]. Schr. Math. Inst. u. Inst. Angew. Math. Univ. Berlin (in German): 75–116. Zbl 0019.37004.

== See also ==
- Secret operation Wicher
