= Fritz Menzer =

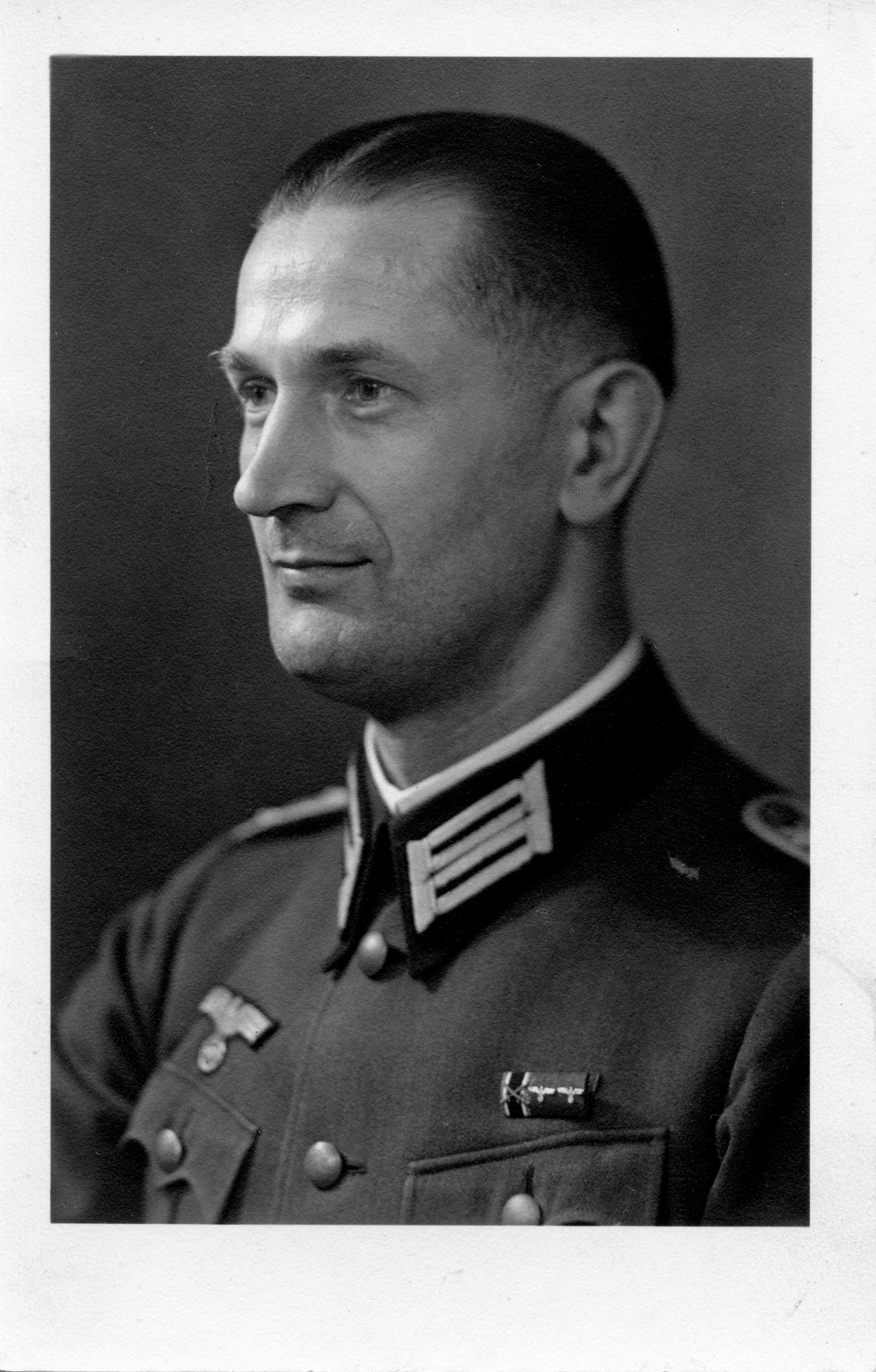
Fritz Menzer in his military uniform at the end of the war

Ostwin Fritz Menzer (6 April 1908 in Herrndorf near Niederschöna in Saxony between Chemnitz and Dresden – 25 October 2005 in Bad Homburg vor der Höhe) was a German cryptologist, who before and during World War II, worked in the In 7/VI, the Wehrmacht signals intelligence agency, later working in (OKW/ Chi) that was the cipher bureau of the supreme command of the Nazi party, and later in Abwehr, the military intelligence service of the Wehrmacht. He was involved in the development and production of cryptographic devices and procedures, as well as the security control of their own methods.

== Military career ==
At the age of 18, he joined the Reichswehr as a mechanic and was assigned to a motorized battalion with a location in Leipzig. Menzer had already developed an interest in cryptography and was granted a patent for a "combined measuring apparatus for angles and lengths, the data [from which was] expressed in an enciphered form in a four-place combination of letters". After 12 years in the Signals Corps, where he had risen to the rank of Oberfunkmeister (a senior NCO rank), where his duties were to lick and seal hundreds of envelopes daily, he was eventually sent to OKW/Chi for testing. After his inclination and aptitude test for cryptanalysis work had been recognized at the Army Signal School, he was transferred to the Cipher Department of the High Command of the Wehrmacht (OKW/Chi) in May 1933, where he was taught cryptanalysis techniques, among others by the head of the main group B, Wilhelm Fenner. A year later, in 1936, in a team led by Otto Buggisch, he had developed cryptanalytic methods to break the C-36, a rotor-key cipher machine of the Sweden Boris Hagelin type. In addition, he developed a cryptanalytic method for breaking the Wehrmacht's own machine, the Enigma machine. Subsequently, he was commissioned to lead his own unit within OKW/Chi, which had to deal with the cryptanalysis of foreign cryptographic methods, as well as the development and security check of own procedures and construction of new cryptanalytic aids. Thus, at the age of 28, Fritz Menzer became the Chief of Communications Security for the German Army. Menzer stated at the time:

Since the troops and their command, because of their ignorance of the scientific status of cryptanalytic methods, regarded encipherment as a drag on modern communications technique; I often had to overcome great difficulties to put through my ideas.

== Civilian career ==
His service as a soldier ended on 32 May 1938 with a rank of Senior Radio Technician. He stayed with the OKW/Chi as civilian. Two years later, in 1940, he was promoted as a government (German: Regierungsinspektor) inspector, and was entrusted with the management of Unit IIc of OKW/Chi, dealing with the development and manufacture of special encryption for government agencies such as Reich Security Main Office and Abwehr, as well as for the German industry. On 1 April 1940, he was promoted to the rank of Superior Government Inspector. With the increased emphasis on cryptographic security and long range communications, in early 1942, Menzer's section was broken up into three functional subsections. Later in 1942, Admiral Canaris gave Menzer the responsibility of testing the security of the Abwehr cryptographic systems.

There is debate about the extent to which Fritz Menzer can actually be regarded as an inventor of partly innovative key machines, such as the key machine 39 and the key device 41. OKW/Chi merely advised development and set requirements, but final control rested with the Armament Agencies and not OKW/Chi. Thus, Menzer was likely involved in the design of the machines and entrusted with their technical review, but not the sole inventor.

Later in 1942, Canaris commissioned Menzer to carry out security checks on their own cryptographic procedures. Menzer recognized blatant cryptographic weaknesses of the methods used, and in the summer of 1943 reworked all the manual methods used by the Abwehr. He introduced the ABC Schlüssel, Procedure 62 and Procedure 40, which were all double transposition (Transposition cipher) and substitution systems, as well as the Schlüsselrad or Cipher Wheel, a hand cranked autoclave.

He remained as an adviser cryptologist in the defense until the end of the war, which he did not experience in Berlin, but together with part of the OKW/Chi under the direction of Wilhelm Fenner in the south of the Reich, in Werfen. On 23 April 1945, OKW/Chi was officially disbanded and the staff was assigned to the General der Nachrichtenaufklärung (GdNA) Just before the American army reached its location about 40 km south of Salzburg, they burned their documents or threw them into the Salzach. With the capitulation of the Wehrmacht on 8 May 1945, the service was terminated for all former members of the OKW. Menzer was captured and interned at the US camp Neufeld near Munich.

On 17 June, he was released and travelled to the Soviet Zone of Occupation, first to the city of Leipzig, and on 22 September to Zschopau, where he worked as a teacher from January 1946. Shortly afterwards, he was dismissed as unsuitable, due to his past in the Wehrmacht. In the turmoil of the beginning of the Cold War he again came in contact with the Americans in Berlin on 8 September 1947 and was taken to Camp King in Oberursel near Frankfurt. Menzer was released and returned to Zschopau on 12 September. He was arrested on 20 September by the Soviets, imprisoned in Dresden, and interrogated about his contacts with the Americans. Finally, on 13 March 1948, he was released after he had consented to spy for the Soviets. In April 1949, he decided to flee from the Soviet Zone and travelled to the Western occupation zones (Allied-occupied Germany) via West Berlin. His name last appeared in documents in 1951. In 1973, he was awarded the Federal Cross of Merit.

A death notice from the Frankfurt area shows his death at the age of 97 years. According to this notice, he was buried on 5 November 2005 in Bad Homburg

== Menzer's inventions ==
During Menzer's service with the OKW/Chi and the Abwehr between 1935 and 1945, he was responsible for a number of advances in the machine cryptography science. His technique was to adapt the use of Hagelin pin wheels to provide for irregular wheel motion in cryptographic machinery.

Before World War II, there were two types of cipher machinery used by Germany. These were the Enigma cipher machine and those of Hagelin type cryptographic machinery. In the latter, all wheels stepped once with each encipherment with the cycle extended by the use of different length wheels. For the Enigma, motion was of the odometer-type, with the only variation being the starting point of the cycle on each rotors. Fritz Menzer's inventions were designed to make such motions unpredictable.

Device types and description
German Device Name	Translation	Year Invented	Notes on Device
Lückenfüllerwalze	Gap-filling wheel	February 1943	In a normal Enigma rotor, on the left side, it had a movable (with respect the rotor) ring with a single drive notch, and on the right a fixed 26 notched blocking wheel that regulated the drive. When the drive notch on one rotor reached the reading position, the next subordinate rotor would advance one position. For the Lückenfüllerwalze, the notch ring was fixed on the rotor and had 26 drive notches, any of which could be filled in to make them inactive, thus providing for irregular stepping of the subordinate rotor. Dr Walter Fricke was responsible for initial design of the device.
Schlüsselgerät 39 (SG-39)	Key device 39	1939	Main article: Schlüsselgerät 39
M40	Device 40	February 1940	This was a machine designed by Menzer in 1940 and never put into use. The machine was mechanical in operation. It was a cylinder, with about 30 slots for cipher alphabets. These slots were rotated by a hand crank, and might move from 0 to 3 slots after each letter. The plain text alphabet was mixed and was in a fixed horizontal slot. The plain text was enciphered by reading from this plain text alphabet to the cipher alphabet which had been brought next to it. Otto Buggisch described the principles as that of the Trittheim Table, a historic cryptographic principle from the 17th century. It was a form of Polyalphabetic cipher. The motion was governed by 3 (or possibly 4) with positive and negative lug settings as with the Hagelin machines. The motion was the sum of the positive settings, subject to an overlap principle, similar in principle to the M-209 device. Otto Buggisch did not know the cycle of the motion of the wheels, or the details of the construction by which they acted to vary the motion when the crank was turned. Additional security was provided by using only 36 strips at one time, leaving about 4 slots blank. When these slots reached the enciphering position, a random letter was chosen and inserted in the cipher text, and the plain text letter was enciphered by the next strip that came to the enciphering position. No ideas were ever formulated on the total number of strips to be used, or the frequency of settings changes. Preliminary tests by Dr Doering and Otto Buggisch, gave the machine a high security rating. However it was just as bulky as the Enigma cipher device, and could not print letters, which was then the chief improvement desired. For these reasons it was rejected, and only a lab model was ever built.
Schlüsselgerät 41 (SG-41)	Key Device 41	1941	Schlüsselgerät 41 - Hitlermühle Main article: Schlüsselgerät 41 This cipher machine was based on Hagelin encipherment, but included a mechanism for variable stepping the Hagelin wheels. The device had six pin wheels which were mutually prime. The first five of these wheels had kicks of 1,2,4,8 and 10 respectively. The sixth wheel made these kicks positive and negative. The enciphering cycle of one letter, consisted of three elements: 1. This took place if, and only if, the sixth wheel had an active pin the motion index position. If this was the case, then all the following occurred: Wheel 1 moved one step. Each of the remaining four wheels moved one step unless the wheel to its left had an active pin in the motion index position in which case it would move two steps.; 2. A key kick was generated which was the sum of all the kicks of wheels which had active pins in the kick index position. However, if the sixth wheel had an active pin in kick index position, the key kick would be 25 minus the sum of all the other kicks. Under such a circumstance, the key would complement itself.; 3. Identical to step 1, except when it occurred whether or not Wheel 6 had an active pin in the motion index position. In this step, Wheel 6 also stepped one or two positions, depending on the state of Wheel 5.; The original specifications called for a lightweight, durable machine to be used by units forward of the division. Menzer designed it to provide a cipher tape, being keyboard operated in order to improve encryption speed. As a result of the keyboard operation, he was able to redesign the arrangement of letters on the print wheels to flatten the cipher frequency count. During the war there was shortages of aluminum and magnesium resulting in the machine weighing between 12 and 15 kilograms, which was too heavy for field use. Removal of the keyboard would have made the machine lighter, but the design of the print wheels prevented their being directly used for encipherment. Production stopped because no one knew what to do. About 1000 machines were built and these were distributed to the Abwehr, which began using them in 1944. The Luftwaffe supposedly used these for 10 figure traffic, which was possibly for weather reports.
Schlüsselkasten	Key case, Cipher Box		The Cipher Box was a mechanical cipher device making use of the principles of sliding strips. Basically, it was a 3/4 pound aluminum box containing three Hagelin pin wheels and a coil spring which determined the stepping of a sliding strip or slide rule on the top of the box." Two alphabets were written on the slide rule, 13 characters of each on the fixed base, and 13 characters of each on the top and the bottom of the sliding strip. The latter were so written that only one alphabet at a time was in phase. Alphabets could be changed as often as required. In use, the slide was pulled to the right until it stopped, winding the spring that drove the mechanism. Pressing a button released the slide to move left. When at either or both of reading positions, $A_1$ $A_2$, the pinks were all inactive, the slide stopped and the encipherment took place. If the step came from $A_2$ alone, or $A_1$ and $A_2$ together, the slide took an additional step. When the slide stopped, either the top or the bottom alphabet would be in phase and the cipher value could be read off. Pressing the button again would allow the strip to slide left to its next stop. Many Enigma devices were planned to be replaced with the Schlüssselkasten. It had a fairly high level of security. Given the alphabets on the side rule, it was possible to recover the pin patterns with a crib of about 30 letters. Without the crib, computer assistance would have been necessary and large quantities of cipher would have been required to recover the alphabets. A modification was considered in which two 26-character alphabets were slid against one another, rather than the 13 character segments. This would have increased the device security considerably, since more text would have been required to recover the alphabets. It would, however, have simplified recovery of the pin pattern after alphabet recovery. The solution of a single message was most unlikely
Schlüsselscheibe	Lock washer		This was designed by Menzer for use by agents. The principle of operation was similar to the Schlüssselkasten. Three resettable but permanently notched wheels were used. For encryption, the inner disk was rotated to wind the spring. Pressing the key would release the inner disk and allow it to rotate until stopped by the notched rings. If the inner disk stopped in a position were its letters were in phase with those of the outer disk, the cipher value would be read directly. If the stop was in an intermediate position, the number of the line opposite the plain value would be read, and the cipher value taken from the cell with that number.
Schlüssselrad	Key Wheel		The Schlüssselrad was a hand-operated cipher device also designed for agent use. It was made up of two disks. The lower disk had 52 notches or holes around its edge, into which a pencil or stylus could be inserted to turn a disk. On the face of the disk were 52 cells into which a keyboard-mixed alphabet could be inscribed twice, clockwise. The upper disk had a direct standard alphabet inscribed clockwise on one half of its periphery, next to a semicircle windows that, when two disks were assembled concentrically, revealed 26 characters of mixed sequence on the lower disk. The upper disk also had a notch into its edges which exposed ten of the holes on the lower disk. This notch had the digits 0 to 9 inscribed next to it, in a counterclockwise direction so that when the exposed holes were lined up with the numbers, the letters on the lower disk were lined up with the letters on the upper disk. Various methods of key generation were used. On Chilean links, an 11-letter key word was numbered as for a transposition key, with the first digit of a two-digit numbers dropped. This key was extended by appending a two-digit group count and a four-digit time group: A N T O F O G A S T A 1 6 0 7 4 8 5 2 9 1 3 1 2 1 4 4 0 On other links, a Fibonacci sequence of 100-125 digits would be generated through various manipulations of date, time and a secret number. If a message were longer that the key, it would be reversed as many as times as necessary. Key generation tables were also used. In use, the key constituted the input to an autoclave. After aligning the alphabets according to a prearranged system or according to an indicator in the message, a stylus was inserted into the hole corresponding to the first key digit, and the lower disk was rotated clockwise until the stylus was stopped by the end of the notch. The plain text was then found on the upper disk and its cypher value read off the lower disk. The stylus was then placed in the whole corresponding to the second digit of the key, and the same procedure was repeated for the second letter of the text. Thus, the true key at any point in the same cypher was equal to the sum of all previous key inputs (mod 26).
