= Hans-Peter Luzius =

German actuarial mathematician and economist

Hans-Peter Luzius (19 February 1912 – after 1964) was a German actuarial mathematician and economist. Luzius was most notable for his work during World War II on researching a method to cryptanalyse the M-209 mechanical cipher machine that led to the first recovery of key based on a crib, while he was conscripted to the Inspectorate 7/VI, the signals intelligence agency of the Wehrmacht, while based at Matthäikirchplatz in Berlin, close to Bendlerblock.

== Life ==
Luzius was born in Berlin, the son of the merchant Jakob Peter Luzius. He graduated from high school on 12 March 1930 and began studying at the Humboldt University of Berlin in the summer semester of 1930, supplemented by a semester (summer semester 1931) at the University of Göttingen. He travelled to the United Kingdom in 1933 and the United States shortly thereafter. There he worked for some time as an actuary at the Alliance Insurance Company and perfected his knowledge of the English language. He was later described as having a 'near perfect English with a strong American accent'.

== Career ==
In April 1936, Luzius graduated as a teacher in mathematics, physics and chemistry. In 1938 he received his doctorate at the Humboldt University of Berlin with a doctoral thesis titled, "Method for the approximate calculation of the risk reserve fund in life insurance using moments", (German:Methode zur näherungsweisen Berechnung des Risikoreservefonds in der Lebensversicherung unter Benutzung der Momente). His doctoral supervisor was Paul Riebesell (1883-1950). In 1941 he was called up for military service and transferred almost immediately to the In 7/VI at the Oberkommando des Heeres. From 3 February 1941, he worked in Unit 7 that was responsible for Security of own procedures first under Carl Boehm and after his departure, from April 1941 under his previous deputy, the mathematician Hans Pietsch.

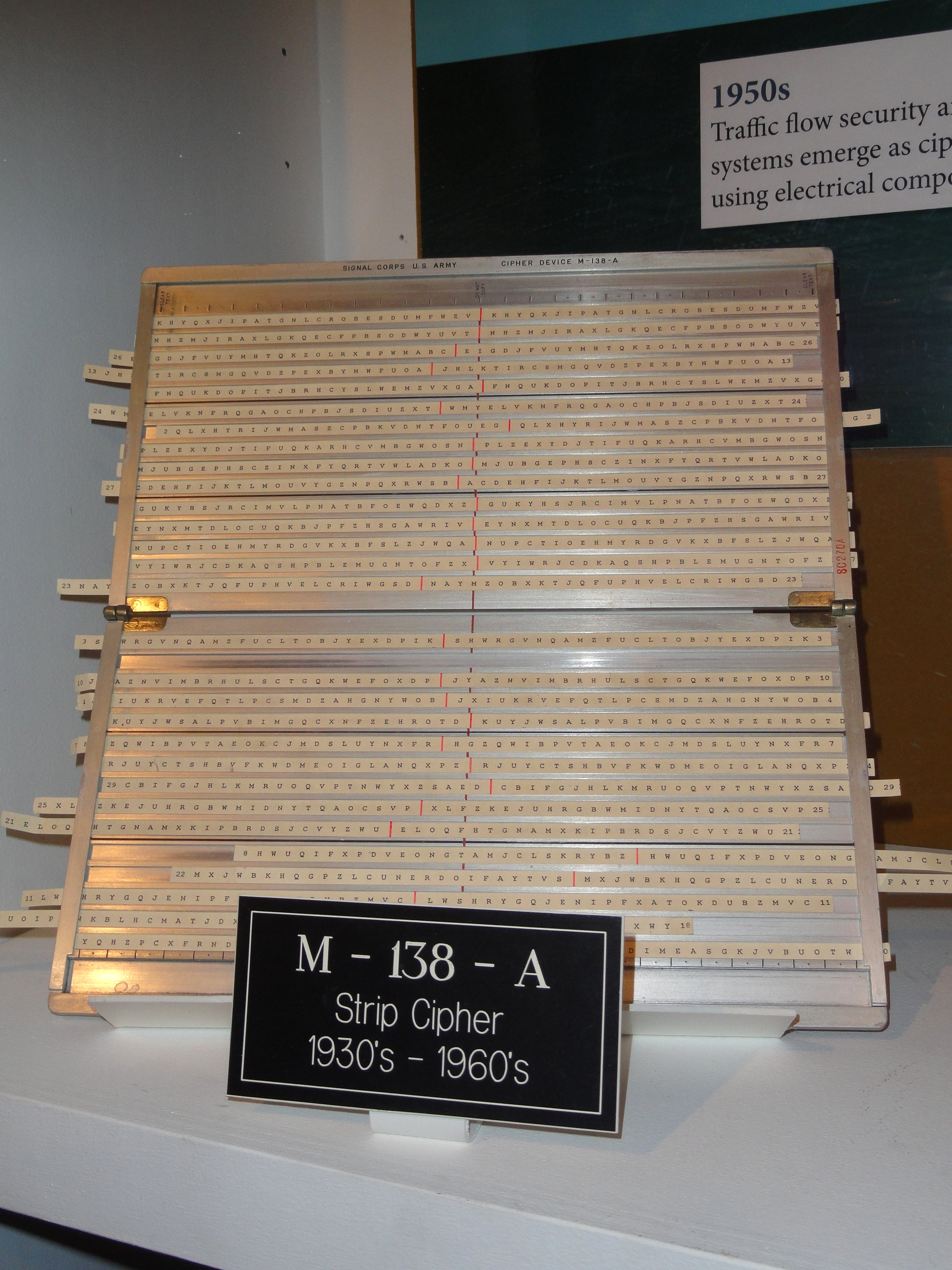
Exhibit in the National Cryptologic Museum, Fort Meade, Maryland, USA. The strip cipher M-138-A was one of the methods that could be broken

After the German declaration of war on the United States on 11 December 1941, an American desk was established at OKH/In 7, to which Luzius was transferred. One of his first successes as a cryptanalyst was the solution of the American strip cipher, which cryptographically corresponded to the cipher cylinder M-94, but instead of the discs simple stripes which could be exchanged more easily. There were procedures using 25 and with 30 strips.

In 1943, together with his colleagues Rudolf Kochendörffer, Willi Rinow and Friedrich Steinberg, he succeeded in breaking into the M-209, rotor cipher machine originally developed by the Swedish cryptographer Boris Hagelin, that was widely used by the US military during World War II. The Wehrmacht called it the AM-1 for American machine No. 1.

In October 1944, towards the end of the war, the intelligence unit of the German army was restructured and merged. This is how the service of the General der Nachrichtenaufklärung (GdNA) was born. Immediately before the end of the war, large parts of the OKH turned south with the aim of reaching Bad Reichenhall. Luzius, on the other hand, headed north, finally reaching Flensburg, where he lived after the war. After the war was involved in the German Actuarial Society and published several papers during the period between 1956 and 1964.
