= Staats House =

Staats House may refer to:

- Joachim Staats House and Gerrit Staats Ruin, built c. 1700, listed on the NRHP in Rensselaer County, New York
- Staats House (South Bound Brook, New Jersey), Abraham Staats House, built c. 1740, listed on the NRHP in Somerset County, New Jersey
- Staats House (Stockport, New York), Abram Staats House, also Abraham Staats House, built c. 1654–1664, in Columbia County, New York
