= Staats House (Stockport, New York) =

Coordinates: 42°18′37″N 73°46′16″W

The Staats House is a historic building located along the Hudson River near Stockport, Columbia County, New York, United States. The first house at this site was burned and rebuilt on the original foundation c. 1664.

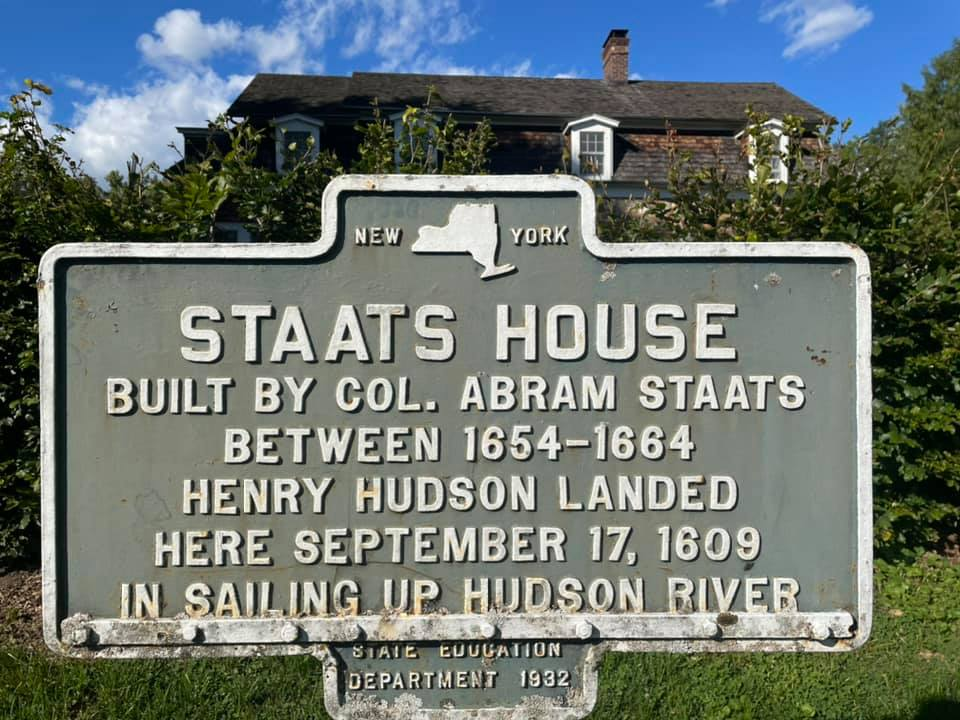
Abram Staats House, Stockport, NY

The house was constructed by Abraham Staats circa 1652–1665 with stone walls which are three feet thick. Native American Indians burned the house and killed the original tenant and abducted his wife, but the structure was rebuilt. The house was built on the site where Henry Hudson purportedly landed in 1609.

== See also ==
- List of the oldest buildings in New York
