= Rasterschlüssel 44 =

Rasterschlüssel 44 (abbr. RS 44) was a manual cipher system, used by the German Wehrmacht during the Second World War. The cipher was designed by the astronomer and sometime cryptographer Walter Fricke while working as a conscript in Section IIb of Group 2 of OKW/Chi and introduced in March 1944 and the Allied forces codebreakers had considerable difficulties in breaking it. Cryptanalysis, if successful, generally required a 40 letter crib (known plaintext) and some two weeks, making the tactical information outdated before it could be exploited. The combination of strength and ease of use made RS 44 an ideal hand cipher.

== Design ==
The cipher is a transposition based grille cipher, consisting of a grid with 25 columns and 24 rows. Each row contains 10 randomly placed white cells (to be filled with text) and 15 black cells. The columns are labeled with shuffled digraphs and numbers and the rows with digraphs. The key sheet also contains two letter substitution alphabets to encode place names, prior to encryption, and a letter conversion alphabet to encode digraphs. The text is written in the grid, starting from a randomly chosen position, row by row, from left to right. The ciphertext is taken column by column, following the numbering of the columns. The first column to be taken is calculated from the minutes of the message time, the letter count of the message text and the randomly chosen column of the start cell. The message key contains the start position of the text in the grid, designated by the column and header digraphs. The digraphs for the message key are encoded with the letter conversion table and then included in the message header. The secret variable start cell and first column ensure a unique transposition for each message, making multiple anagramming very difficult.
