= Werner Liebknecht =

German engineer

Werner Liebknecht (born 1 June 1905 in Waltershausen) was a German engineer who held the rank of Beamter at Referat Wa Prüf 7 of the Waffenamt during World War II. He was responsible for the design and development of many of the cryptographic devices used by German Armed Forces during World War II, including the cipher teleprinter attachment, the SZ 40 and the Siemens and Halske T52 secure teleprinter.

== Life ==
From 1911 to 1925, Liebknecht attended Volksschule and Oberrealschule in Sonneberg. Between 1925 and 1927, he studied Electrical engineering at the Technische Hochschule München (now TU Munich) and between 1927 and 1931 he studied Communications engineering at the Technische Hochschule Charlottenburg (now TU Berlin), and graduated with a Dipl.-Ing.

In February 1932 to May 1932, Liebknecht worked at the Heinrich Hertz Institute within the Broadcast Receiver section. From June 1932 to December 1936 Liebknecht worked at the Technische Hochschule Charlottenburg as Assistant at the Institute for communication techniques. In May 1936, he became a Doctor of Engineering.

== War work ==
From January 1937 to 9 April 1945 Liebknecht worked at the Waffenamt, Group WA Prüf 7 Section II in Wire Communication Techniques. His work on speech encipherment involved working on technical questions of speech (Ciphony) and on Wireless telegraphy and on telegraphy in general, Liebknecht conducted engineering design on teletype encoding of the SZ40 and SZ42 for the Germany Army. From 1 May 1942 to 9 April 1945 Liebknecht moved to Group WA Prüf 7 Section III in Wireless Communication Techniques. From 1 April 1942 to 1 July 1943 Liebknecht undertook the same field of work as in Liebknecht Section II. From 1 July 1943 to 9 April 1945, Liebknecht's field of work expanded to include hand encoding devices before he moved to WA Prüf 7/IV, (German: Nachrichtenaufklärung) Interception of Enemy Signals.

His main field of work was on the technical work on speech scrambling.
