= Staats =

Staats is a surname of German and Dutch origin and a given name.

== Surname ==
Notable people with this surname include:

- Abraham Staats (1620–ca. 1694), Dutch settler
- Alfred Staats (1891–1915), German gymnast
- Austin Staats (born 1998), Haudenosaunee lacrosse player
- Barent Staats (1796–?), American politician
- Craig Staats, American politician
- Dewayne Staats (born 1952), American sports broadcaster
- Elmer B. Staats (1914–2011), American public servant
- Johnny Staats, American musician
- Léo Staats (1877–1952), French dancer
- Peter Staats, American physician
- Randy Staats (born 1992), Haudenosaunee lacrosse player

== Given name ==
- Staats Long Morris (1728–1800), American colonist
