= Abraham Staats =

Settler of New Netherland

Major Abraham Staats or Abram Staes (Amsterdam January 19, 1620 (baptized)– New York ca. 1694) was one of the first settlers of the New Netherland colonies and is the founder of the Albany branch of the Staats family in New Amsterdam and the early American colonies.

== Early life ==
Staats was born in Holland around 1618 and his parents were Isaac Staats (b. ca. 1586) and Sara Lauwers (1588–1641), originally from Antwerp.

== New Amsterdam ==
In 1642, he emigrated to Beverwijck (now known as Albany). Staats and his wife, Trijntje, traveled to New York on board of the Houttuijn. He was employed as a surgeon in the New Netherland by the Van Rensselaer family.

== Personal life ==
On January 26, 1642, Staats married, in Amsterdam, to Trijntje "Catharina" Jochems (1621–1703), daughter of captain Jochem Gijsen and Trijntje Gerrits. Together, they were the parents of:

- Jochem Staats (1654–1712)
- Dr. Samuel Staats (1657–1715)
- Elizabeth Staats (1659–1737), who married Johannes Wendell (1649–1692), and after his death, Johannes Schuyler (1668–1747)
- Abraham Peter Staats (b. 1665), who married Elsje Wendell
- Jacob Staats (b. ca. 1665)

=== Honors ===
His name is given to some early place names in the Hudson Valley, such as Staats Island, Staats Point (on the Hudson), and Abram Staats Kill (Creek). The Staats House, which he built, is currently the oldest home in Columbia County.
