= Hindenburg Kaserne =

Former military garrison in Franconia, Germany

- Würzburg, Germany Hindenburg Kaserne (Germany)

Site information
- Type: Military Garrison

Location
- Coordinates: 49°47′52″N 009°54′15″E

Site history
- In use: 1935–1993
- Demolished: 2011

Garrison information
- Occupants: II Abteilung, Artillerie-Regiment 93 (Wehrmacht)

Hindenburg Kaserne, also known as Hindenburg Barracks, was a former military garrison, located near in the Zellerau district in the city of Würzburg, in Franconia, Germany. The kaserne (English: barracks), was situated between Weißenburgstraße, Mainaustraße and Moscheeweg. It was active as a military base between 1935 and 1993.

== History ==
Construction began on the kaserne in 1934. In 1935 it was named in honor of Paul von Hindenburg, a field marshal who commanded the German army in World War I and who was elected as President of the German Reich in 1925. In 1935 the kaserne was given over to the Wehrmacht. Hindenburg Kaserne was occupied by the II Abteilung des Artillerie-Regiments 93 (English: 2nd Battalion (Heavy), 93rd Artillery Regiment) on 12 October 1937. This unit saw action in the Polish Campaign as part of the XVI Army Corps (Wehrmacht), and the French Campaign as part of the IV Army Corps (Wehrmacht).

Following World War II, Hindenburg Kaserne was occupied by the U.S. Army from 1945 until its closure in 1993.

== Current Use ==
After the withdrawal of US forces, the facility has been largely demolished. For several years the area lay fallow, due in part to environmental cleanup efforts. At the beginning of March, 2012, Freistaat Bayern purchased most of this area for use by the Staatliche Feuerwehrschule Würzburg (English: Würzburg City Fire Brigade School). As part of the expansion of the school, several practice areas and buildings have been built. Groundbreaking for this €29.5 million construction project was in the summer of 2013.

In addition to the fire brigade school, portions of the area along Moscheeweg, Weißenburgstraße and Mainaustraße make up part of the Grüne Mitte Zellerau, an outdoor fitness area and green space.

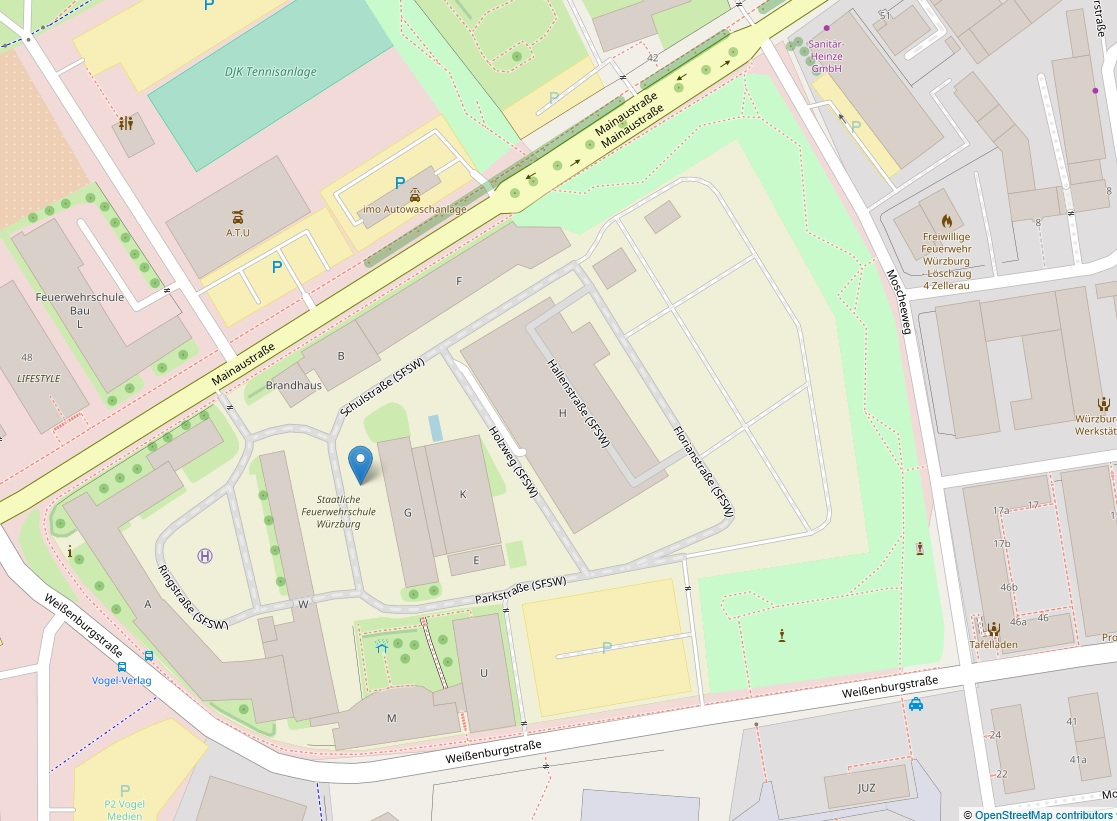
Map of the former Hindenburg Kaserne
