= Walter Fricke =

Cryptanalyst, mathematician and professor

Walter Ernst Fricke
- Dr. Walter Fricke in 1968
- Born: 1 April 1915; Leimbach-Mansfeld near Merseburg, Germany
- Died: 21 March 1988 (aged 72); Heidelberg, Germany
- Citizenship: German
- Education: Berlin University
- Known for: Working as cryptanalyst with OKW/Chi, Fourth Fundamental Catalogue (FK4)
- Awards: Prix Jules Janssen of the Société astronomique de France in 1974. Dirk Brouwer Award of the American Astronomical Society at the Division on Dynamical Astronomy in 1982. Order of Merit of the Federal Republic of Germany (First Class) (German:Verdienstkreuz) of the Federal Republic of Germany in 1981
- Scientific career
- Thesis: Influence of a resisting agent in the dynamics of dense stellar system. (1940)
- Doctoral advisor: Otto Heckmann

Walter Ernst Fricke (1 April 1915 – 21 March 1988) was a distinguished German professor of theoretical astronomy at the University of Heidelberg. He was a mathematician and cryptanalyst during World War II at the Wehrmacht signals intelligence agency, Inspectorate 7/VI from 1941 to 1942 (which would later become the General der Nachrichtenaufklärung. In 1942 he was transferred to the OKW/Chi Section IIb. His specialty was the production of codes and ciphers, and the security studies of Army systems. After the war he was director of the Astronomical Calculation Institute (German: Astronomisches Rechen-Institut) in Heidelberg, Germany.

== Life ==
Walter Fricke was born in Leimbach-Mansfeld near Merseburg, Germany. His father was a carpenter who worked as a miner in the copper-schist mines at Mansfeld. Walter Fricke attended a high school Stephaneum in Aschersleben and passed the final examination (Abitur) in 1934. After high school, he enrolled as a student at Frederick William University in East Berlin, studying astronomy, mathematics and physics. His teachers there included Paul ten Bruggencate and August Kopff in astronomy, Erhard Schmidt in mathematics and Max von Laue in physics.

In 1935, he published his first astronomy papers. These were critiques of Edwin Hubble's studies made at Mount Wilson Observatory on the distribution of spiral nebulae. In 1939, while resident at the Göttingen Observatory, he received his doctorate with a thesis titled Influence of a resisting agent in the dynamics of dense stellar systems (Einfluß eines widerstehenden Mittels in der Dynamik dichter Sternsysteme). He obtained a scholarship to the University of Edinburgh in Scotland, which was arranged with the help of British theoretical cosmologist Dr George C. McVittie, which was due to start on 1 October 1939 but had to be cancelled because of the start of World War II in September 1939. On 1 May 1940 he started work at Hamburg Observatory, and later in that year was drafted into the Signal Corps (Nachrichtentruppe). On 15 May 1941 he was posted to Inspektorate 7, the cipher bureau of the Wehrmacht (German Armed Forces) high command, although as an astronomer he knew nothing about cryptography and cryptanalysis. Professor Otto Heckmann, director of the Hamburg Observatory, tried to lure him back to continue working on problems specifically related to war work that he had been occupied with before he was drafted: tables of air and ship navigation, aerodynamic problems for aeroplanes traveling at speeds over 1300 km/hour as well as rockets flying at speeds of more than 3000 km/hour. These were purely solutions to differential equations which were allocated to various institutions for solving.

A minor planet discovered on 15 February 1941 by Karl Wilhelm Reinmuth in Heidelberg was named "1561 Fricke" in his honour. In 1942 he was appointed the assistant astronomer at the Hamburg Observatory at Bergedorf, but could only take the position up in 1946 due to conscription.

In 1943 Fricke married Marianne Fricke (née Traute). They had a daughter, Maxi-Marianne Fricke. His wife Marianne died in 1987.

In 1951, he received his habilitation from University of Hamburg. In 1953, after receiving a fellowship from the German Science Foundation, he went to the United States for a year, working at the Yerkes, Mount Wilson, Palomar and Princeton University Observatories. After returning, he became a tenured member (Wissenschaftlicher Rat) of the Hamburg Observatory. In December 1954, Dr Fricke was made the provisional director of the Astronomical Calculation Institute in Heidelberg. Heidelberg University appointed him an honorary professor in 1955 and a personal full professor in 1958. In 1961 he became a regular full professor of theoretical astronomy at Heidelberg.

Fricke served as president of the International Astronomical Union Commissions 4 (1958–1964) and 8 (1970–1973), and as vice president of the IAU from 1964 to 1967.

On 1 April 1983 he retired as professor emeritus. Dr. Dr. h.c. mult. Fricke stayed on as Director of the Institute until 30 September 1985, and continued his scientific work until he was hospitalized with cancer in 1987.

== Scientific work ==
Fricke had a wide interest in astronomy. His first publications dealt with problems in theoretical and observational astronomy. Then for the next two decades, from the time of his thesis onwards, his interests focused on stellar dynamics, working from the observatory in Bergedorf. His favourite subject was the photographic surface photometry survey of the Andromeda Nebula.

In addition, in 1951 he published with Otto Heckmann and Pascual Jordan an important work for the extension of Einstein's theory of gravity.

After being appointed to the Astronomical Calculation Institute, Fricke concentrated on fundamental astrometry. He worked specifically to improve the fundamental reference system, a series of measurements of the position and motions of a series of fundamental stars that is important for study of kinematics and dynamics of objects within the Galactic system. The production of this kind of fundamental catalogue, which provided the astronomical representation of an inertial system, was part of the institute's important work. His finest contribution to astronomy was the derivation, together with his colleagues and his predecessor August Kopff, of the Fourth Fundamental Catalogue (FK4), published in 1963. The FK5 catalogue was strongly associated with his name, but he was unable to view it when it was published; it used a new constant of precession which he derived himself and adopted by the IAU in 1976.

Fricke made significant contributions toward the establishment of the European Southern Observatory in 1962 and the Max Planck Institute for Astronomy (Max-Planck-Institut für Astronomie) in Heidelberg, with its observatory in Calar Alto, Spain.

== Cryptographic work ==
While in the military, Fricke studied German cipher methods and devised new ones.

Fricke's initial task was working on the solving of the double stop system, NS 42, code named the Double Playfair (Doppelkastenschlüssel). The Army, Air Force and Police used the Double Playfair system as a medium-grade hand cipher in World War II. The Playfair TS 42 single stop system had already been broken at that point if there were more than 3000 letters of traffic a day. After a year's work, they solved the problem by using vertical bigram frequencies. As the text was written in double lines of 17 or 21 and the substitutions taken vertically, plain text bigram frequencies could not be used. Combined frequencies of pairs of single letters showed a sharp drop after the top three values, EE, EN and NE (the last two had the same frequency). Of a text length of 10000, they could place the three values only initially. Hollerith counts (frequency analysis) were undertaken against messages from the Polish War, but as these were of a stereotypical nature, words could only be guessed after high-frequency digraphs (i.e. pairs of letters) had been created. Using this method led to the recovery of more pairs, and the guessing of words. However, the solution was never used, as even though they believed 3000 letters would be enough to break a message, the Army never informed them what the actual volume of traffic was, so the system continued in use.

Around the same time, he worked on the French C36 cipher machine with fixed lugs, designed by Boris Hagelin, which was solved by cribs. He later heard from others that cribs were no longer needed.

The head of his section at OKH/Chi (Army Cipher Office) was Hans Pietsch, who managed eight mathematicians in the group. He remained there until 1 November 1944, when he was transferred to the OKW/Chi. At this time Inspektorate 7 was forbidden to create new systems, which was strictly restricted to OKW/Chi. At OKW/Chi, Dr Fricke managed Section IIb of Chi II (Group 2), the main group managing OKW/Chi's interception services. Section IIb, which developed German code and cypher systems (camouflage, codes and cyphers, and telephone secrecy) and also advised on the production of keys and the supervision of production, had a staff of 14. OKW/Chi cipher bureau was a strictly military organization.

In 1942, he developed the codebook (Schlüsseltafel) for enciphering tables for 3 letter field codes. Before that were used without encipherment. Daily changing trigraphic substitution tables were introduced, initially made by Hollerith machines. He stated in his TICOM interview that there were two master decks of 500 cards each, with a trigraph on each card. Late in the war, the Hollerith machine section moved to Weimar, so Walter Fricke told the printer to make up a set of three-letter slugs of type corresponding to the code groups, which were called Logotypen. The printer had the plain code values in alphabetical order in a form, with blank spaces for the encrypted values. He was told to draw two logos from the mixed batch and place the second one opposite that plain value which was the same as the first. This procedure was repeated until the reciprocal table was created. It also had the effect of enabled untrained workers to make fewer mistakes.

He went on to design and develop the raster key hand cipher (Rasterschluessel 44), which was to replace the double playfair cipher. A study was made on the British cipher raster, Cysquare which was created by John Tiltman in 1941. The Cysquare cipher had been pinched from Britain, when Rommel's Afrika Korps overran British units and captured the Cysquare and pads with their instruction booklets. Fricke found it to be excellent, a very secure and practical hand cipher, but he didn't know if it had been broken, with the English using 40 letters and large number of abbreviations. He knew that if German forces used the cipher as it was, it soon would be broken because of longer messages. In order to use longer messages, 26 rows were created, of which 24 were used at any one time. The requirement was to choose all rasters from a systematically constructed field, and to satisfy the following requirements simultaneously:

- All rasters should have a fixed number of columns with 20 white cells, a fixed number with 18 and so on.
- Vertically adjacent white cells should be kept to a minimum.
- And when they did not occur, they must not be less than eight nor more than 12 white cells apart.

These conditions were difficult to achieve, since as soon as one requirement was achieved the others would go wrong. The purpose of making all from the same field was to avoid special cases. However, they were eventually required to be made from 20 to 40 master fields. As regards changing keys, the printer was given lead strips bearing the pattern of each of the 36 rows, of which 24 were chosen for each raster. The minimum message length was initially set to 60 characters but was lowered to 45 by the army after some use. Fricke asked the TICOM interrogators

whether the cipher was ever solved, because he was convinced if properly used it would be unbreakable, but they never knew whether mistakes were made which rendered it soluble. They replied it would be impossible for them to give him an answer. Fricke stated that they always wanted to work on their own traffic just as they would on foreign material, but were never allowed to. He never understood how the army actually used the cipher and never saw any real traffic. When they asked for real traffic, they were offered specially prepared messages, one of which read
We are standing in Berlin and see the Polish infantry coming down the Frankfurter Allee.

They reflected on the fact that the work on Russian systems showed that these systems were secure if properly used, but if the cryptographers in Moscow could only see how they were used they would be very unhappy.

== Awards and honours ==
- Prix Jules Janssen of the Société astronomique de France in 1974
- Dirk Brouwer Award of the American Astronomical Society at the Division on Dynamical Astronomy in 1982
- Order of Merit of the Federal Republic of Germany (First Class) (Verdienstkreuz) in 1981
- Member of the Academy of Sciences Leopoldina in Halle, Germany
- Associate member of Royal Astronomical Society
- Honorary Member of the Division on Dynamical Astronomy of the American Astronomical Society
- Member of the Academy of sciences in Heidelberg, Milan, Vienna and Moscow
- External Member of the Max Planck Institute for Astronomy in Heidelberg
- Foreign Member of the Bureau des Longitudes in Paris
- Honorary Doctor of Philosophy degree from University of Thessaloniki in 1968

== Bibliography ==
Parts of this article have been sourced from TICOM document:

- "TICOM I-20 Interrogation of Sonderfuehrer Dr Fricke of OKW/CHI (Formerly of OKH/CHI) 28 June 1945" (PDF). TICOM.

== See also ==
- Cryptanalysis of Double Playfair.
