= Rudolf Bailovic =

Serbo-Croatian interpreter and cryptographer

Rudolf Bailović (1885 in Sarajevo) was a Serbo-Croatian interpreter and cryptographer, of Austrian descent, who was head of the Balkan Referat of General der Nachrichtenaufklärung during World War II. Bailović held the civil service rank of civil servant (German: Regierungsrat) and was promoted to senior civil servant or Oberregierungsrat in 1944. Bailović was considered an anti-Nazi, who held anti-Nazi views, and refused to wear German decorations when in uniform. Bailović was also a Turkish interpreter and spent significant time in evaluation, providing intelligence.

== Military career ==
Bailović held the rank of colonel in the Austro-Hungarian Army and had served as an officer in Trieste, before he was promoted to director of the Austrian cipher bureau during World War I. He was considered a middle ranking official of the Austrian cipher section, by Fenner, before and during World War II. During the Anschluss, Bailovic refused to surrender the keys of his department to the Nazis when Austria was subsumed. Subsequently, he was relegated to a minor position in the Austrian civil service. General Erich Fellgiebel and Fritz Thiele, recognising his potential, ordered Wilhelm Fenner to Vienna, to bring Bailović, along with seven of his colleagues back to Germany, to be employed as cryptanalysts and evaluators. In the final tally, only four people came back with Bailović, that included Joseph Seifert, the then current director of the Austrian cipher bureau. Upon their landing in Germany, a Forschungsamt official met the party at the airport where the Forschungsamt (abbr. FA) official offered money to Bailović to work for them, which Fenner found disturbing.

Bailović initially worked for the FA, which was the Luftwaffe's chief Hermann Göring private cipher bureau, specifically for the Nazi Party. Bailović worked at the FA unit for several months, when he left unexpectedly and was known to be employed by Inspectorate 7/VI by Autumn 1941, when he ran the Balkan desk. During this period, the results from solving both codes and cyphers in the Balkan section were generally forwarded to KONA 4, the Signals unit assigned to the Balkans theatre.

For much of his working life in Inspectorate 7/VI, Bailović ran the informal Bailović Party, an anti-Nazi group. After the 20 July plot, the Nazi, Grupperleiter Major Lechner was appointed to replace Major Mettig as commander of In 7/VI. The Bailović Party held the most able personnel and was highly regarded, but dwindling Balkan traffic meant the unit became superfluous, and lost most of its prestige and power. With a new Nazi leader in Major Lechner, the group was disbanded. Bailović was removed from the unit, along with several others, with Lechner being posted to the west to become commander of KONA 6.

In October 1944, Bailović was appointed to the OKW/Chi in the position as head of the desk dealing specifically with Balkan traffic. Towards the end of the war, he became an administrator, after the Balkans were invaded as Balkan message traffic dwindled and became progressively rarer, as the war reached its conclusion.

He died in 1958 and is buried at Hernals cemetery in Vienna.
