= Herbert von Denffer =

German military cryptanalyst (b. 1907)

Herbert Julius von Denffer (born 4 June 1907, date of death unknown) was a German actuarial mathematician. He was born in Narva, Estonia. During World War II, Denffer worked as a cryptanalyst in Referat F, the Mathematical Referat, as part of the Inspectorate 7/VI, that was the signals intelligence agency of the Wehrmacht, before and during World War II. He would later work for the General der Nachrichtenaufklärung, the successor organization to the In 7/VI, specifically undertaking research in general theory of cryptography.

== Life ==
Denffer was the son of author and banker Alexander von Denffer from the aristocratic Denffer family. On 26 February 1926, he received his Abitur certificate from the Marienstiftsgymnasium Gymnasium. Denffer undertook 3 semesters of study at the University of Tübingen and 6 semesters at the Humboldt University of Berlin. Denffer was eventually awarded an academic scholarship for gifted students, the Studienstiftung to undertake advanced study in mathematics at Berlin. On 15 December 1933, he became an actuarial mathematician and worked at the Association of Public Life Insurance Institutions (German: Verband öffentlicher Lebensversicherungsanstalten) in Berlin. On 8 February 1935, he was promoted to Dr. Phil with a theses titled: On the Bernstein theory of partial differential equations of the second order of the elliptical type (German: Über die Bernsteinsche Theorie der partiellen Differentialgleichungen zweiter Ordnung vom elliptischen Typus).

At the end of the war, Denffer was named as chief of the (German: Entzifferung) cryptanalysis unit with KONA 6 at the end.
