= List of Soviet military sites in Germany =

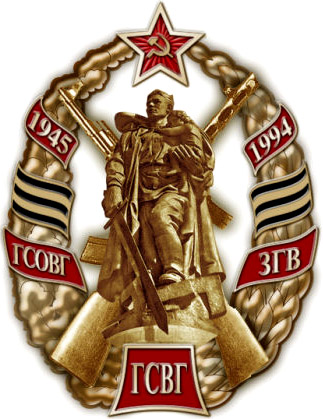
Badge of the GSFG/WGF (1945–1994).

The list of Soviet military sites in Germany contains all military installations and units of the former Soviet Union on German territory. In correlation to Russian native document, original site designations of the Soviet Armed Forces are used as deemed to be necessary (e.g. later changes of site names are avoided). The units and formations were subordinated to the WGF Supreme Commands in Wünsdorf (now in Zossen).

Period	Native designation		German		English	
Period	Short	Long version	Short	Long version	Short	Long version
1945–1954	ГСОВГ	Группа советских оккупационных войск в Германии	GSBD	Gruppe der Sowjetischen Besatzungstruppen in Deutschland	GSOFG	Group of Soviet Occupation Forces in Germany
1954–1989	ГСВГ	Группа советских войск в Германии	GSSD	Gruppe der Sowjetischen Streitkräfte in Deutschland	GSFG	Group of Soviet Forces in Germany
1954–1989	ГСВГ	Группа советских войск в Германии	GSTD	Gruppe der Sowjetischen Truppen in Deutschland	GSFG	Group of Soviet Forces in Germany
1989–1994	ЗГВ	Западная группа войск	WGT	Westgruppe der Truppen	WGF	Western Group of Forces

== Baden-Württemberg ==
site designation	real estate designation	user before	unit	year of disbandment	user after	remark
Baden-Baden	Cité Paradis		MMS (Mission Militaire Soviétique)	1992		Military Missions of the GSFG, accreditation to FFA

== Berlin ==
site designation	real estate designation	user before	unit	year of disbandment	user after	remark
East Berlin	Pionier-Kaserne		6th Guards Motor Rifle Brigade	1991–1994		Berlin-Karlshorst
West Berlin	Kammergericht am Kleistpark		Allied Control Council (Контрольный совет)	1948/1991		Berlin Schöneberg

== Hessen ==
site designation	real estate designation	user before	unit	year of disbandment	user after	remark
Frankfurt am Main	Frankfurt Niederrad		Soviet Military Mission (SMM)	1992		accreditation to United States Army Europe, Heidelberg (USAREUR Soviet Military Liaison Mission Control Facility, Frankfurt am Main, Creighton W. Abrams Complex)

== New states of Germany ==
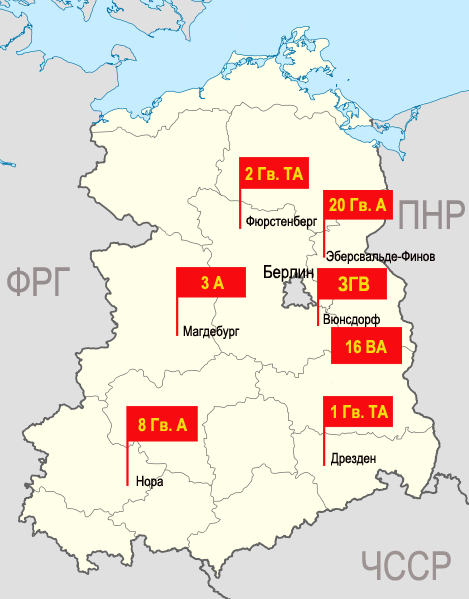
Dislocation map HQ WGT and HQ of the WGF Armies on territory on the former GDR

The tables below contains the location of military unit and formation of the Western Group of (Soviet) Forces (WGF) on territory of the New federal states of Germany with particularities as follows:

- The English designation of military units and formations of the WGF (column 1) is in line to these in NATO, as deemed to be necessary. Honorary titles, names, or distinctions are omitted. In case of doubt, the original designation in Russian language is authoritative.
- Column 2 contains the original site's designation, in accordance with – Soviet troops in Germany 1945 to 1994, memorial album, edition Moscow, published by «Jang Guard», 1994; ISBN 5-235-02221-1, pages 15 to 22.

=== Supreme Command GSFG (WGF) and direct subordinates ===
The Supreme Command GSFG (WGF) comprised the staff divisions and direct subordinated units, formations and facilities, as follows (in 1991):

Designation	Site location	Unit		Remark
Designation	Site location	Number	Code name	Remark
1	2	3	4	5
Staff GSFG/WGT	Wünsdorf			also: General Staff, C2 Staff. In part of former German Maybach I and II complex.
Political Division	Wünsdorf			
Alternate Operations Center	Möhlau	24 382	Redut	
Operations Command Air Defence	Wünsdorf	01 131		
1014th Command Post Air Defence	Wünsdorf	18 178		
Armament Division	Wünsdorf	56 663		
Reconnaissance Division	Wünsdorf	89 430		
CIS Division	Wünsdorf	16 470		also: Communications Division
Engineer Division	Wünsdorf	24 566		
Medical Division	Wünsdorf	07 365		
Logistics Division	Wünsdorf	71 650		
Chemical Division	Wünsdorf	24 445		also: NBC-Division
Direct subordinates				
3rd Guards Spetsnaz Brigade	Fürstenberg/Havel, Neuthymen; 53°12′24″N 13°12′14″E	83 149		withdrawn to Tolyatti
35th Guards Air Assault Brigade	Cottbus, Hermann-Loens-Kaserne	16 407	Wesky	withdrawn 1990
6th Independent Guards Motor Rifle Brigade	Berlin-Karlshorst barracks: Festungspionierschule	64 944	Morechod	Withdrawn to Kursk
133rd Independent Motor Rifle Battalion	Berlin-Karlshorst	81 544		
154th Independent Motor Rifle Battalion	Berlin-Karlshorst	65 007		
178th Independent Motor Rifle Battalion	Berlin-Karlshorst	65 016		
53rd Independent Tank Battalion	Berlin-Karlshorst			
54th Independent Tank Battalion	Berlin-Karlshorst			
65th Independent Tank Battalion	Berlin-Karlshorst			
53rd Guard and Logistics Regiment	Wünsdorf	80 340	Wal	
814th Independent Air Defence Missile Regiment	Rechlin	96 574	Rediska	
27th Pontoon Bridge Regiment	Lutherstadt Wittenberg	50 920		
57th Military Constructing Brigade	Forst Zinna, to Jüterbog	72 760		
Vehicle Repair and Workshop Battalion	Potsdam	55 872		
Ensemble vocal music and folk-dance	Wünsdorf	48 251		
Editorial staff, news papers: «Sowjetskaja Armya»; «Naslednik Pobjedy» until 1991	Wünsdorf	48 251		
1249th Independent Logistics Battalion	Potsdam	55 946		
199th Independent Medical Battalion	Potsdam	50 642		
Central Hospital	Beelitz-Heilstätten			
Air Force Hospital	Königs Wusterhausen			
Air Force subordinates				
239th Independent Guards Helicopter Regiment	Oranienburg	79 048	Retutny	Withdrawn to Efremov, Tula Oblast, June 1994.
275th Independent Air Base Support Battalion	Oranienburg	79 048	Retutny	
292nd Independent Electronic Warfare Helicopter Squadron	Cochstedt	22 632	Aeroplan	today: Magdeburg–Cochstedt Airport
1780th Independent Air Base Support Company	Cochstedt			
345th Independent Helicopter Squadron	Nohra	62 023	Nagar	
366th Independent Air Base Support Company	Cochstedt			
39th Independent Reconnaissance Aviation Flight	Sperenberg Airfield	54 243	Sinonim	Also reported as 39. OAO REB - Aviation Detachment for Radio-Electronic Combat
330th Independent Helicopter Flight	Dresden	23 299	Mebel, Lira	
113th Independent Mixed Aviation Squadron	Oranienburg	42 089	Rutnyi	
Artillery subordinates				
HQ 34th Artillery Division	Potsdam	55 872	Vyretska	Withdrawn to Mulino (settlement), Nizhny Novgorod Oblast, 1994.
286th Guards Howitzer Artillery Brigade	Potsdam	50 560	Flazhechny	
288th Heavy Howitzer Artillery Brigade	Chemnitz	50 618		
303rd Guards Cannon Artillery Brigade	Altengrabow	50 432	Ledorez	
307th Missile Artillery Brigade	Chemnitz	80 847	Tsebaka	1987-1989
Repair facility subordinates				
120th Tank Repair Factory	Kirchmöser			to Brandenburg an der Havel
184th Tank Repair Factory	Magdeburg			
193rd Tank Repair Factory	Wünsdorf			
134th Artillery Repair Factory	Fürstenwalde/Spree			
511th Artillery Repair Factory				
556th Engineer Equipment Repair Factory	Werder (Havel)			
133rd Communications Equipment Repair Factory	Luckenwalde			
43rd Vehicle Repair Factory				
52nd Vehicle Repair Factory				
53rd Vehicle Repair Factory				
5th Independent Repair and Restoration Battalion				
Units of the Baltic Navy				
234th Waters Ship Guard Battalion	Saßnitz	09 822		234 DNPLK
Off-shore Special Radio Location Post	Wustrow, Lohme, Wiek	99 721		
Special Weapons Sites				
Special Weapons Depot Brand	Halbe, Brandenburg			52°0′42.6″N 13°46′51.3″E
Special Weapons Depot Finsterwalde	Airfield Finsterwalde			51°35′40.71″N 13°45′11.86″E
Special Weapons Depot Großenhain	Airfield Großenhain			51°18′18.22″N 13°32′56.83″E
Special Weapons Depot Himmelpfort	also: Lychen II, Himmelpfort			53°10′35.6″N 13°16′52.7″E
Special Weapons Depot Stolzenhain	also: SAD Linda, Schönewalde			51°52′0″N 13°9′48″E

=== 1st Guards Tank Army Saxonia ===
unit, formation, Military Unit Number	location	usage		remark
unit, formation, Military Unit Number	location	until 1945	after 1991-1994	remark
1	2	3	4	5
1st Guards Tank Army (V/Ch 08608)	Dresden		Officer School of the Heer	Albertstadt
9th Tank Division (V/Ch 60990)	Riesa			Moved to Smolensk and disbanded.
1st Guards Tank Regiment	Zeithain			
1321st Motor Rifle Regiment	Jüterbog			in Brandenburg
70th Guards Tank Regiment	Zeithain			
302nd Motor Rifle Regiment	Riesa			
96th Self-Propelled Artillery Regiment	Borna			
11th Guards Tank Division	Dresden			Withdrawn to Slonim in Belarus, 1992
7th Guards Tank Regiment	Meissen			
40th Guards Tank Regiment	Königsbrück			
44th Guards Tank Regiment	Königsbrück			
249th Guards Motor Rifle Regiment	Dresden			
841st Guards Self-Propelled Artillery Regiment	Chemnitz			
1018st Air Defence Missile Regiment	Meissen			
20th Guards Motor Rifle Division	Grimma			
29th Guards Motor Rifle Regiment	Plauen			
67th Guards Motor Rifle Regiment	Grimma			
242nd Guards Motor Rifle Regiment	Wurzen			
576th Guards Motor Rifle Regiment	Glauchau			
944st Guards Self-Propelled Artillery Regiment	Leisnig			
358st Guards Air Defence Missile Regiment	Leisnig			
units and formations directly subordinated to the 1st GTA				
225th Independent Helicopter Regiment	Allstedt			
485th Independent Helicopter Regiment	Brandis		Brandis airfield	SN 51°19′42″N 12°39′25″E
181st Rocket Brigade	Kochsttdt			
432nd Rocket Brigade	Wurzen			
308st Artillery Brigade	Zeithein			
53rd Anti-Aircraft Rocket Brigade	Altenburg			
41st Logistic Brigade	Dresden			
235th Independent Radar Control Support Regiment	Merseburg			
68th Pontoon Bridge Regiment	Dresden			
3rd Independent Signal Regiment	Dresden			

=== 2nd Guards Tank Army Brandenburg / Mecklenburg-Vorpommern ===
unit, formation	location	utilisation		remark
unit, formation	location	until 1945	after 1991-1994	remark
1	2	3	4	5
2nd Guards Tank Army	Fürstenberg/Havel			
21st Motor Rifle Division	Perleberg			
239th Motor Rifle Regiment	Perleberg			
240th Motor Rifle Regiment	Ludwigslust			
283rd Guards Motor Rifle Regiment	Hagenow			
568th Motor Rifle Regiment	Parchim			in Mecklenburg-Vorpommern
1054th Self-Propelled Artillery Regiment	Rathenow			
1079th Air Defence Missile Regiment	Perleberg			
16th Guards Tank Division	Neustrelitz			
47th Guards Tank Regiment	Neustrelitz			
65th Guards Tank Regiment	Neustrelitz			
60th Guards Motor Rifle Regiment	Ravensbrück			to Fürstenberg/Havel
723rd Guards Motor Rifle Regiment	Rathenow			
724th Guards Self-Propelled Artillery Regiment	Neustrelitz			
66th Air Defence Missile Regiment	Neustrelitz			
94th Guards Motor Rifle Division	Schwerin			
204th Guards Motor Rifle Regiment	Schwerin			
286th Guards Motor Rifle Regiment	Schwerin			
288th Guards Motor Rifle Regiment	Wismar			
74th Guards Tank Regiment	Schwerin			
199th Guards Self-Propelled Artillery Regiment	Wismar			
896th Air Defence Missile Regiment	Schwerin			
207th Motor Rifle Division	Stendal			in Saxony-Anhalt
33rd Motor Rifle Regiment	Stendal			
41st Motor Rifle Regiment	Gardelegen			
400th Motor Rifle Regiment	Mahlwinkel			
591st Guards Motor Rifle Regiment	Staats			
693rd Self-Propelled Artillery Regiment	Stendal			
75th Guards Air Defence Missile Regiment	Stendal			
units and formations directly subordinated to the 2nd GTA				
172nd Independent Helicopter Regiment	Damm			
439th Independent Helicopter Regiment	Damm			
112th Rocket Brigade	Gentzrode			
458th Rocket Brigade	Neustrelitz			
290th Artillery Brigade	Schwerin			
61st Anti-Aircraft Rocket Brigade	Staats			
613rd Radar Control Post	Lockwisch			
614th Radar Control Post	Badekow (Gresse)			
621st Radar Control Post	Pritzwalk			
631st Radar Control Post	Damgarten			
632nd Radar Control Post	Dranske			
118th Logistics Brigade	Ravensbrück			
250th Independent Radar Control Support Regiment	Stendal			
69th Pontoon Bridge Regiment	Ravensbrück			
5th Independent Signal Regiment	Ravensbrück			

=== 3rd Combined Arms Army Saxony-Anhalt ===
unit, formation	location	utilisation		remark
unit, formation	location	until 1945	after 1991-1994	remark
1	2	3	4	5
3rd Army	Magdeburg			
7th Guards Tank Division	Rosslau			
55th Guards Tank Regiment	Lutherstadt Wittenberg			
56th Guards Tank Regiment	Zerbst			
79th Guards Tank Regiment	Rosslau			
40th Guards Motor Rifle Regiment	Brandenburg an der Havel			
670th Guards Self-Propelled Artillery Regiment	Kochstedt			
278th Guards Air Defence Missile Regiment	Rosslau			
10th Guards Tank Division	Altengrabow			
61st Guards Tank Regiment	Altengrabow			
62nd Guards Tank Regiment	Altengrabow			
63rd Guards Tank Regiment	Altengrabow			
248th Guards Motor Rifle Regiment	Schönebeck			
744th Guards Self-Propelled Artillery Regiment	Altengrabow			
3598th Guards Air Defence Missile Regiment	Altengrabow			
12th Guards Tank Division	Neuruppin			
48th Guards Tank Regiment	Neuruppin			
322nd Guards Tank Regiment	Neuruppin			
353rd Guards Tank Regiment	Neuruppin			
200th Guards Motor Rifle Regiment	Burg			
117th Self-Propelled Artillery Regiment	Mahlwinkel			
933rd Air Defence Missile Regiment	Burg			
47th Guards Tank Division	Hillersleben			
26th Tank Regiment	Hillersleben			
153rd Guards Tank Regiment	Hillersleben			
197th Guards Tank Regiment	Halberstadt			
245th Guards Motor Rifle Regiment	Mahlwinkel			
99th Guards Self-Propelled Artillery Regiment	Malwinkel			
1009th Air Defence Missile Regiment	Hillersleben			
units and formations directly subordinated to the 3rd Army				
178th Independent Helicopter Regiment	Borstel		Stendal-Borstel Aifield	ST 52°37′58″N 11°49′54″E
440th Independent Helicopter Regiment	Borstel		Stendal-Borstel Aifield	
36th Rocket Brigade	Altengrabow			
448th Rocket Brigade	Born			
49th Anti-Aircraft Rocket Brigade	Planken			
212th Radar Control Post	Dähre			
213th Radar Control Post	Ludwigslust			
711th Radar Control Post	Ditfurt			
385th Artillery Brigade	Planken			
254th Independent Radar Control Support Regiment	t.b.d.			
36th Pontoon Bridge Regiment	Magdeburg			
42nd Logistic Brigade	Magdeburg			
105th Independent Signal Regiment	Magdeburg			

=== 8th Guards Army Thuringia ===
unit, formation	location	utilisation		remark
unit, formation	location	until 1945	after 1991-1994	remark
1	2	3	4	5
8th Guards Army	Weimar-Nohra			
27th Guards Motor Rifle Division (V/Ch 35100)	Halle			in Saxony-Anhalt. Withdrawn to Totskoye in the Volga-Ural Military District, May 1991.
68th Guards Motor Rifle Regiment	Halle		in Saxony-Anhalt	
243rd Guards Motor Rifle Regiment	Halle			in Saxony-Anhalt
244th Guards Motor Rifle Regiment	Schlotheim			
28th Tank Regiment	Halle			in Saxony-Anhalt
54th Guards Self-Propelled Artillery Regiment	Halle			in Saxony-Anhalt
286st Guards Air Defence Missile Regiment	Halle			in Saxony-Anhalt
39th Guards Motor Rifle Division	Ohrdruf			
117th Guards Motor Rifle Regiment	Meiningen			
120th Guards Motor Rifle Regiment	Ohrdruf			
172nd Guards Motor Rifle Regiment	Gotha			
585th Guards Motor Rifle Regiment	Ohrdruf			
115st Air Defence Missile Regiment	Orhrdruf			
87st Guards Self-Propelled Artillery Regiment	Gotha			
57th Guards Motor Rifle Division	Naumburg			
170th Guards Motor Rifle Regiment	Naumburg			
174th Guards Motor Rifle Regiment	Weissenfels			
241st Guards Motor Rifle Regiment	Leipzig			
51st Guards Tank Regiment	Zeitz			
128st Guards Self-Propelled Artillery Regiment	Zeitz			
901st Air Defence Missile Regiment	Naumburg			
79th Guards Tank Division	Jena			Remained until July 1992, when withdrawn to Samarkand in the Turkestan Military District. Quickly disbanded there.
17th Guards Tank Regiment	Saalfeld			
45th Guards Tank Regiment	Weimar			
211th Guards Tank Regiment	Jena			
247th Guards Motor Rifle Regiment	Weimar			
172nd Guards Self-Propelled Artillery Regiment	Rudolstadt			
1075th Air Defence Missile Regiment	Weimar			
units and formations directly subordinated to the 8th GA				
336th Independent Helicopter Regiment	Nohra (Weimar)			
486th Independent Helicopter Regiment	Altes Lager		Altes Lager Airfield	BB 51°59′46″N 12°59′2″E
11th Rocket Brigade	Weißenfels			
449th Rocket Brigade	Arnstadt			
18th Anti-Aircraft Rocket Brigade	Gotha			
411th Radar Control Post	Wachstedt			
412th Radar Control Post	Geba			
413th Radar Control Post	Eckartshausen			
7211th Radar Control Post	Stelzen (Siegmundsburg)			Bleßberg
722nd Radar Control Post	Steinheid			
723rd Radar Control Post	Schöneck			
733rd Radar Control Post	Alperstedt			
116th Logistic Brigade	Altenburg			
390th Artillery Brigade	Ohrdruf			
119th Independent Tank Regiment	Bad Langensalza			
65th Pontoon Bridge Regiment	Merseburg			
194th Independent Radar Control Support Regiment	Weimar			
91st Independent Signal Regiment	Weimar			

=== 16th Air Army ===
unit, formation	location	utilisation		remark
unit, formation	location	until 1945	after 1991-1994	remark
1	2	3	4	5
Headquarters	Zossen-Wünsdorf			
6th Guards Fighter Aviation Division	Merseburg			
31st Guards Fighter Aviation Regiment	Falkenberg/Elster			
85th Guards Fighter Aviation Regiment	Merseburg			
968th Fighter Aviation Regiment	Nobitz Altenburg			
139th Aviation Technical Regiment	Merseburg			
16th Guards Fighter Aviation Division	Damgarten			
33rd Fighter Aviation Regiment	Wittstock			
773rd Fighter Aviation Regiment	Damgarten			
787th Fighter Aviation Regiment	Finow			
126th Fighter Aviation Division	Zerbst			
35th Fighter Aviation Regiment	Zerbst			
833dr Fighter Aviation Regiment	Altes Lager			
125th Fighter-bomber Aviation Division	Rechlin			
19th Guards Fighter-bomber Aviation Regiment	Lärz		Müritzflugplatz Rechlin-Lärz	MV 53°18′23.10″N 12°45′11.30″E
20th Guards Fighter-bomber Aviation Regiment	Groß Dölln			
730dr Fighter-bomber Aviation Regiment	Neuruppin			
105th Fighter-bomber Aviation Division	Großenhain			
296th Fighter-bomber Aviation Regiment	Großenhain			
559th Fighter-bomber Aviation Regiment	Finsterwalde			
911th Fighter-bomber Aviation Regiment	Brand Airfield			
Separate units, direct subordinated to the 16th AA				
11th Separate Reconnaissance Aviation Regiment	Welzow			
226th Separate Mixed Aviation Regiment	Sperenberg (Am Mellensee)			BB 52°08′22.56″N 13°18′18.76″E
357th Separate Ground Attack Aviation Regiment	Brandis			
368th Separate Ground Attack Aviation Regiment	Tutow			
2140th Aviation Technical Depot	Strausberg			BB 52°34′12.76″N 13°52′54.34″E

=== 20th Guards Army Brandenburg ===
unit, formation	location	utilisation		remark
unit, formation	location	until 1945	after 1991-1994	remark
1	2	3	4	5
20th Guards Army	Eberswalde			
35th Motor Rifle Division	Krampnitz			
62nd Motor Rifle Regiment	Potsdam			
64th Motor Rifle Regiment	Potsdam			
69th Motor Rifle Regiment	Wünsdorf			
83rd Guards Motor Rifle Regiment	Krampnitz			
219th Tank Regiment	Elstal / Olympisches Dorf			
283rd Guards Self-Propelled Artillery Regiment	Elstal / Olympisches Dorf			
200th Air Defence Missile Regiment	Krampnitz			
90th Guards Tank Division	Bernau			
6th Guards Tank Regiment	Bad Freienwalde			
68th Guards Tank Regiment	Bernau			
215th Guards Tank Regiment	Bernau			
81st Guards Motor Rifle Regiment	Eberswalde-Finow			
400st Artillery Regiment	Bernau			
288th Air Defence Artillera Regiment	Bernau			
6th Independent Guards Motor Rifle Brigade	Berlin Karlshorst			
units and formations, direct subordinated to the 20th GA				
337th Independent Helicopter Regiment	Mahlwinkel			ST 52°23′24″N 11°46′59″E
486th Independent Helicopter Regiment	Prenzlau			
27th Rocket Brigade	Jüterbog			
464th Rocket Brigade	Fürstenwalde			
67th Anti-Aircraft Rocket Brigade	Elstal / Olympisches Dorf			
387th Artillery Brigade	Altes Lager			
117th Logistic Brigade	Eberswalde			
264th Independent Radar Control Support Regiment	Neudenbritz			
44th Pontoon Bridge Regiment	Frankfurt an der Oder			
6th Independent Signal Regiment	Eberswalde			
512th Radar Control Post	Fürstenwalde			

=== Units directly subordinated to the GSFG ===
The following units were directly subordinated to the GSFG's headquarters.

unit, formation	location	utilisation		remark
unit, formation	location	until 1945	after 1991-1994	remark
1	2	3	4	5
GSFG headquarters	Wünsdorf			
157th Anti-Aircraft Rocket Brigade	Primerwald			
164th Rocket Brigade	Drachhausen			
175th Rocket Brigade	Oschatz			
133rd Anti-Aircraft Rocket Brigade	Jüterbog			
202nd Anti-Aircraft Rocket Brigade	Magdeburg			
40th Radar Control Support Brigade	Wittstock			
45th Radar Control Support Brigade	Merseburg			
1st Engineer Brigade	Brandenburg an der Havel			
118th Signal Brigade	Wünsdorf			
119th Signal Brigade	Leipzig			
132nd Signal Brigade	Treuenbrietzen			
34th Artillery Division	Potsdam			
286th Howitzer Artillery Brigade	Potsdam			
288th Heavy Howitzer Artillery Brigade	Chemnitz			
303rd Guards Gun Artillery Brigade	Altengrabow		Training area Altengrabow	MV 52°9′26.28″N 12°13′17.4″E
307th Missile Artillery Brigade	Chemnitz			
122nd Antitank Artillery Brigade	Königsbrück			
64th Motor Vehicle Brigade	Kummersdorf			
65th Motor Vehicle Brigade	Fürstenwalde			
27th Pontoon Bridge Regiment	Lutherstadt Wittenberg			
272nd Independent Signal Regiment	Frankfurt an der Oder			
29th Independent Electronic Warfare Regiment	Schönewalde			
67th Anti-Aircraft Rocket Brigade	Elstal			
163rd Anti-Aircraft Rocket Brigade	Leipzig			
252nd Anti-Aircraft Rocket Brigade	Gera			
239th Independent Guards Helicopter Regiment	Oranienburg			
