= Kunibert Randewig =

German Signals officer before and during World War II

Kunibert Randewick (born 7 February 1898 in Neisse) was a German Signals officer before and during World War II who was responsible for the establishing of several intercept out-stations and later becoming commander of all KONA regiments in the west. He would eventually achieve his wish of becoming Chief Signals Officer. Randewick was involved in the design of radio components of the V-2 rocket, specifically researching remote control via wireless steering, remote detonation and remote jamming. At the start of World War II, Randewig was already a veteran of Soviet Wireless telegraphy traffic and a supporter of decentralisation.

== Life ==
Randewig was the Son of a professional Army officer. While following his father from base to base, his schooling became fragmented. He attended school in Potsdam, Magdeburg, Kuestrin and finally Graulenz, where he took his Abiturium.

== Military career ==
He originally intended to study architecture, but owing to a strain on his fathers financial resources, he entered the Army as a Subaltern in July 1914, and was posted to the regiment, Garde Telegraphie in Berlin. During World War I, Randewig was posted to the Western Front where he successively worked on the Telephone department of VII Corps, High Command of the GKDO, and then subordinated to the Adjutant of Officers Training Course.

=== Interwar period ===
In 1918, Randewick joined the Freikorps volunteer unit, and at the end of 1919 moved to the Grenzschutz Ost. On 1 October 1920, Randewig was taken into the Reichswehr Army of 100,000 men and became an Adjutant of the Reiterabteilung III at Potsdam. Between 1922 and 1923, Randewig was placed in the wireless training academy at the army base in Jüterbog. Between 1923 and 1925 he was the adjutant of Regimental Commander of Signal Troops in Group Kdo 2, (Army Group) in Kassel. Promoted to Oberleutnant Lieutenant and between 1925 and 1927 became Zugführer, Platoon leader of Signals department 5 in Stuttgart. Between 1927 and 29, he held the same appointment in Signals Department 1 in Königsberg. Between 1929 and 33 Randewig was part of the staff of 1st Division as Commanding Officer of Wireless Telegraphy (abbr. W/T) interception in Königsberg, and promoted to Hauptmann (Captain). On 1 April 1933 Randewig was Staff Captain at Signals Abteilung 4 in Dresden and then promoted Company commander of the W/T company. In November 1934 he was Chief Signal Officer of General Kommando 9 (Corps Area) in Kassel. On 19 April 1938, he became Commanding Officer of Signals Training, but later took part in the Anschluss.

=== World War II ===
In 1939, Randewig was responsible for three signal intercept companies posted to the West Wall. It was feared by Germany that France would invade Germany, and Randewig's job was to use his intercept companies to detect any movement in the French forces. In August 1939, Randewig was mobilised into the O.C. Signals Operational Abteilung (department) of the Army Advanced Guard. At the time, there were two fixed intercept stations in the west-Stuttgart and Münster. Randewig's next posting was the Signals Interception unit in Zeppelin bunker in Wünsdorf near Zossen, Brandenburg, to intercept signals from Poland. In mid September 1939, he became Commanding Officer Intercept Troops, West and helped to build up the new Army H.Q in Giesen. During this period, his commitments were against France, Belgium and Holland inclusively. In April 1940, the Intercept unit that Randewig was commanding was split into three separate units, to cover Army Group A, B and C. Each had a Commanding Officer (O.C.) of Signals Interception and Randewig was made Commanding Officer of Signal Interception of Army Group A, with General Gerd von Rundstedt as his G.O.C. Working until the end of June, Randewig was working with three intercept companies monitoring French radio communications exclusively. On 1 April 1940, Randewig started studying message interception from radio communications from Great Britain. Facilities available were the fixed intercept station at Husum, the Münster and Euskirchen. They were also two mobile intercept companies together with Direction finding (abbr. D/F) sections. This went on until April 1941. General Rundstedt was then posted to the Eastern Front and Randewig's unit was posted as well. The Army Group became Army Group South. Randewig was promoted to (German: Oberstleutnant) Lt. Colonel and to (German: Oberst) Colonel in 1942. There were three companies engaged in Signals Interception against the Soviets, KONA 1, KONA 2 and KONA 3.

In October 1942, Randewig was to become Commander of Signals of the 3rd Romania Army but fell ill. In February–March 1943, he was posted to Führerreserve at Halle. In April Randewig became C.S.C. of Armeeoberkommando 15, in the Netherlands area. In July, Randewig was again posted to the Führerreserve, as a result of indiscreet criticism of the regime. In October 1943, proceedings against him stopped as he was given a warning. In December 1943, he was posted as C.S.C of Armeeoberkommando, located between Romania and Kiev where he stayed until August 1944.

In August 1944, Randewig was ordered by OKH to be responsible for all questions concerning W/T in connection with rockets. He stayed at H.W.A. Berlin until the end of August 1944.

=== V-2 rockets ===
On 1 September 1944, Randewig was subordinated to Major-General Dr. Walter Dornberger. It was on this date that the use of V-2 rockets was ordered by SS Obergruppenführer Hans Kammler, and Randewig was ordered to the town of Kleve to join Kammler's staff. He was posted to Division 2 z b.V 1191 Signal Abteilung and dealt with signals communications within the Division as well as the special job of W/T interception within the Division. Randewig explained while under interrogation to Combined Services Detailed Interrogation Centre, that it was feared at the time that similar weapons would be used by the Allies against Germany. The special job consisted of keeping a watch on all signals which might be found to be control beams or signals for such weapons.

In November 1944, Randewig was appointed Army Chief Signals Intelligence Officer (Abbr. CSO) (German: Heeresnachrichtenführer) Z.b.V 700 (Army CSO). His headquarters was in Potsdam which was operated for the Wehrmacht (as distinct from the Army alone). He was only concerned with impulse traffic beams, jamming and remote detonation.

By February 1945, this type of particular work became impossible, as bombing and allied advanced made any form of liaison impracticable. During that month, Randewig became responsible for the reorganization of Decimetre communications and W/T teleprinters (Siemens and Halske T52) of the Army. This lasted until the end of March or the middle of April. This commission had two main tasks:

1. The establishment of Decimetre communications with the cut-off Army Group Courland.
2. The establishment of Decimetre communications between Berchtesgaden and Plön after the Allied breakthrough. This was working on 12 April 1945 and continued to do so until German capitulation.

Between April and May 1945, Randewig was promoted to Commander of Signals North (German: Kdr. der Führunsnachrichtentruppen Nord). Subsequently, he was promoted to Chief of Signals for Army Group Blumentritt, a unit that formed on 8 April 1945, and which was an ad-hoc collection of depleted units on the Weser river from Hameln to the Baltic Sea. The unit, created by Infantry General Günther Blumentritt, was operational right up until the end of the war.

== General ==
Randewig was a technician who was very keen on intercept problems. From 1940 to 1942, he bombarded the Chief Signal Officer of the Wehrmacht, Erich Fellgiebel with memoranda on the necessity for a centralised control of intercept and on the need for setting up a centralised intercept unit staffed by at least, 3000 technicians. As a result of this agitation, he was pushed out of the intercept service until August 1944, when he was recalled to advise on certain problems of V2 operations.
