= 337th Regiment =

337th Regiment may refer to:

- 337th Infantry Regiment (United States)
- 337th Infantry Regiment (Wehrmacht), part of the 208th Infantry Division in World War II; see Vinkt massacre
- 337th Independent Helicopter Regiment, Russian Air Force (formerly Soviet Army)

== See also ==
- 337th (disambiguation), for other kinds of military unit known as "The 337th"
