= 337th =

337th may refer to:

- 337th Aeronautical Systems Group, inactive United States Air Force unit
- 337th Air Control Squadron, part of the 33d Fighter Wing, an AETC unit, based at the USAF Tyndall Air Force Base, Florida
- 337th Airlift Squadron, part of the 439th Airlift Wing at Westover Air Reserve Base, Massachusetts
- 337th Brigade, Royal Field Artillery, part-time unit of the British Army's Royal Artillery from 1860 to 1956
- 337th Flight Test Squadron, most recently part of the 46th Test Wing and based at McClellan Air Force Base, California
- 337th Independent Helicopter Regiment, based in Tolmachevo Airport in the town of Ob, Siberia
- 337th Infantry Division (Wehrmacht), German Army infantry division in World War II
- 337th Infantry Regiment (United States), National Army Infantry Regiment first organized for service in World War I
- 337th Rifle Division (Soviet Union), first formed in August 1941, as a standard Red Army rifle division, at Astrakhan
- 337th Test and Evaluation Squadron, squadron of the United States Air Force
- 337th Volksgrenadier Division (Wehrmacht), German military unit during World War II

== See also ==
- 337 (number)
- 337, the year 337 (CCCXXXVII) of the Julian calendar
- 337 BC
- 337 Squadron (disambiguation)
