= Bertingen =

- Ortsteil of Angern
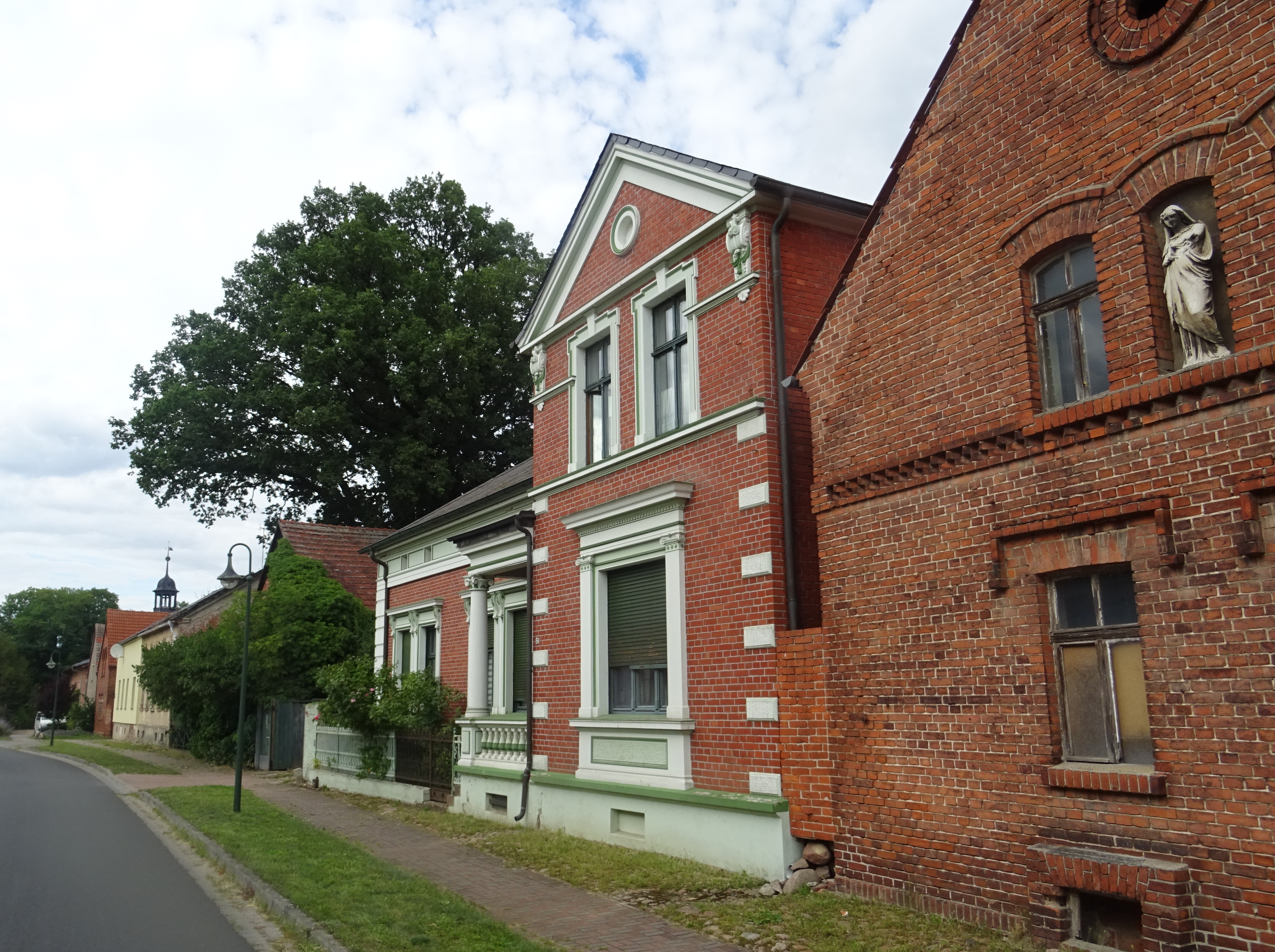

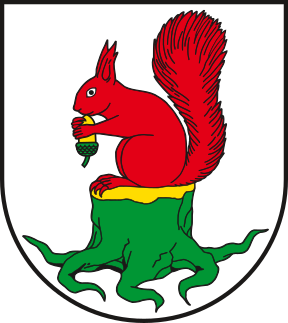
- Coat of arms
- Interactive map of Bertingen
- Location within Germany Location within Saxony-Anhalt
- Coordinates: 52°21′N 11°49′E
- Country: Germany
- State: Saxony-Anhalt
- District: Börde
- Municipality: Angern

Area
  - Total: 11.18 km^{2} (4.32 sq mi)
- Elevation: 47 m (154 ft)

Population (2006-12-31)
  - Total: 197
  - Density: 17.6/km^{2} (45.6/sq mi)
- Time zone: UTC+01:00 (CET)
  - Summer (DST): UTC+02:00 (CEST)
- Postal codes: 39517
- Dialling codes: 039366
- Vehicle registration: BK

Bertingen is a village and a former municipality in the Börde district in Saxony-Anhalt, Germany. Since 1 January 2010, it is part of the municipality Angern.
