= Schönberg, Mecklenburg-Vorpommern =

Town in Mecklenburg-Vorpommern, Germany

Schönberg
- Town
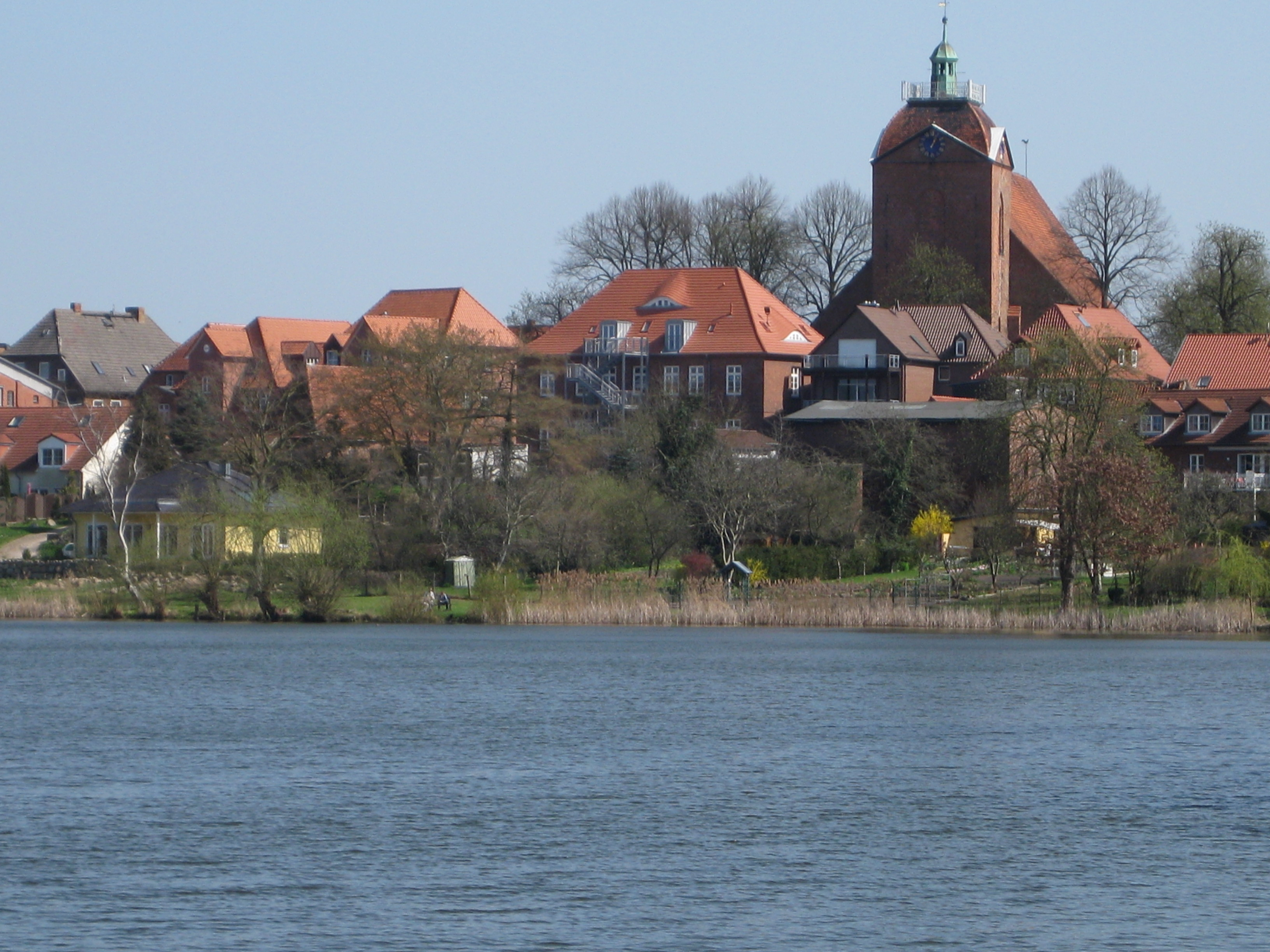
- Schönberg, Mecklenburg-Vorpommern

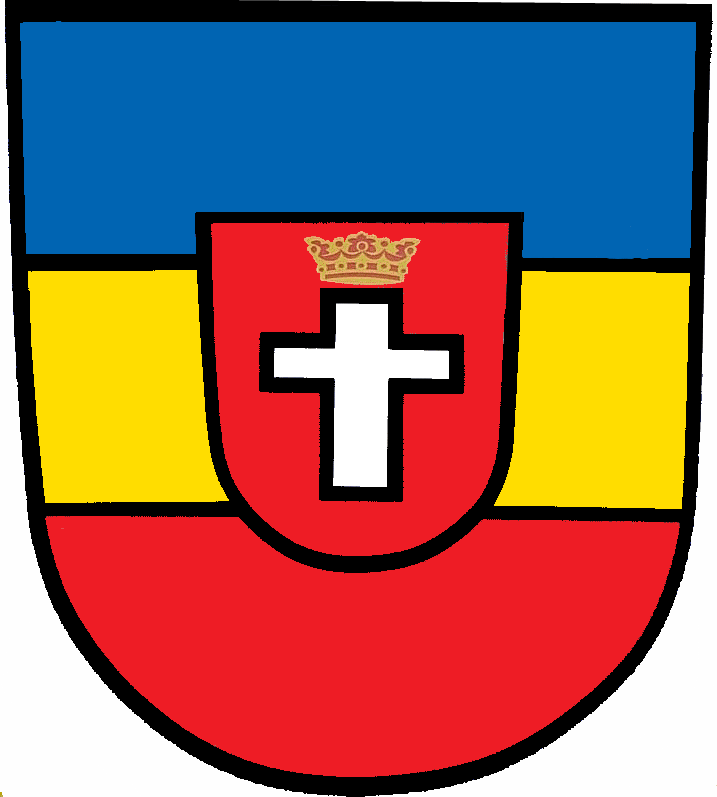
- Coat of arms

- Location of Schönberg within Nordwestmecklenburg district
- Interactive map of Schönberg
- Location within Germany Location within Mecklenburg-Vorpommern
- Coordinates: 53°51′N 10°55′E
- Country: Germany
- State: Mecklenburg-Vorpommern
- District: Nordwestmecklenburg
- Municipal assoc.: Schönberger Land

Government
  - Mayor: Stephan Korn

Area
  - Total: 52.19 km^{2} (20.15 sq mi)
- Elevation: 7 m (23 ft)

Population (2025-12-31)
  - Total: 4,285
  - Density: 82.10/km^{2} (212.6/sq mi)
- Time zone: UTC+01:00 (CET)
  - Summer (DST): UTC+02:00 (CEST)
- Postal codes: 23923
- Dialling codes: 038828
- Vehicle registration: NWM
- Website: www.stadt-schoenberg.de

Schönberg (German pronunciation: [ˈʃøːnbɛʁk]) is a town in the Nordwestmecklenburg district, in Mecklenburg-Vorpommern, Germany. It is situated 16 km east of Lübeck, and 7 km from the Dassower See. Schönberg is the city seat of the Schönberger Land, a recently enlarged subnational administrative unit of Mecklenburg-Vorpommern. Its population as of 2017 was 4,778.

Schönberg is also close to the cities of Wismar and Schwerin and is part of the Hamburg Metropolitan Region.

== History ==
The first formal mention of the city of Schönberg came in the year 1219, and shortly after became the residence of the Bishopric of Ratzeburg. Schönberg was occupied by the Soviets and became a part of East Germany. There's a Soviet graveyard a little distance before the city's train station. The former municipality Lockwisch was merged into Schönberg in January 2019.

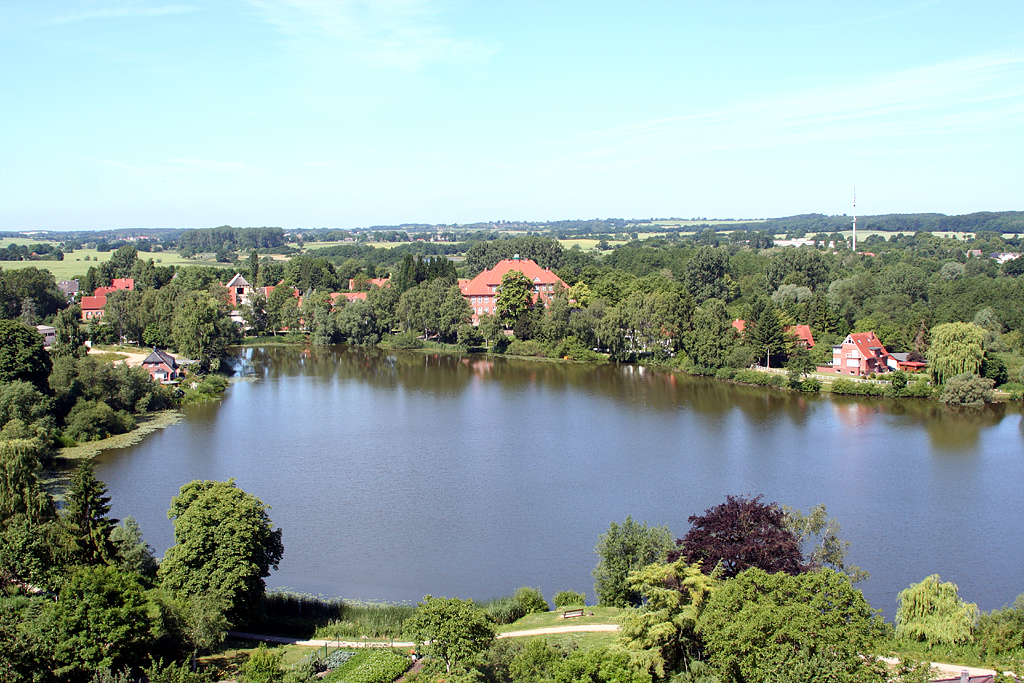
View over Schönberg

== Education ==
The largest school within the city, Ernst-Barlach Gymnasium, is located on the Oberteich and contains grades 7 to 12 with 570 students. The school was subjugated to many different names and uses throughout its history since its opening in 1846. Under the German Democratic Republic (Deutsche Demokratische Republik) the school was reformed to hold grades 9-12 and was changed twice as the Erweiterte and Rudolf Hartmann Polytechnic Oberschules. In 1991 with the fall of East Germany, it was changed again to Gymnasium Schönberg until 2001 when students voted it to its current name.

The town also gives a Grundschule or primary school, as well as a Regionale Schule.

== Twin Cities ==
- Ratzeburg of Schleswig-Holstein, Germany, since 1990.
- Färgelanda, Sweden, since 2005.
