= Großer Wünsdorfer See =

Lake in Brandenburg, Germany

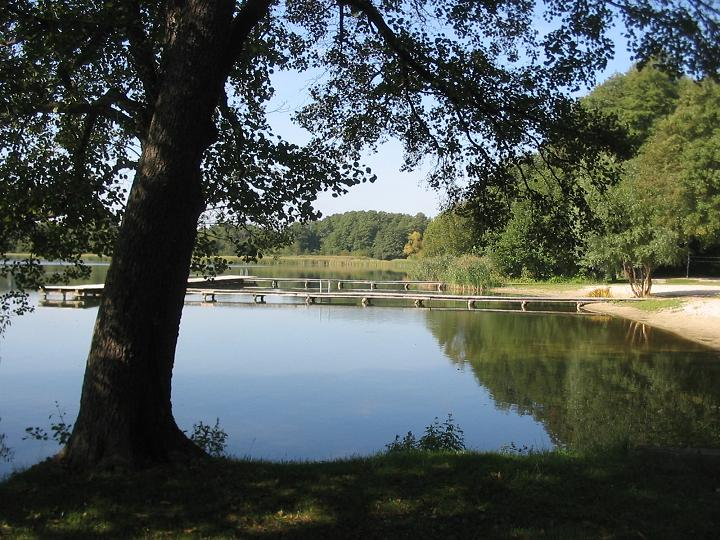

- Location within Brandenburg
- Location: Brandenburg
- Coordinates: 52°09′47″N 13°28′28″E
- Primary outflows: Wünsdorfer Kanal
- Basin countries: Germany
- Max. length: ca. 1.8 km (1.1 mi)
- Max. width: 1.8 km (1.1 mi)
- Surface area: 180 ha (440 acres)
- Average depth: 6 m (20 ft)
- Max. depth: 11 m (36 ft)
- Shore length^{1}: 6.4 km (4.0 mi)
- Surface elevation: 39 m (128 ft)
- ^{1} Shore length is not a well-defined measure.

Großer Wünsdorfer See is a lake in Brandenburg, Germany. At an elevation of 39 m, its surface area is 180 ha. It is located at Wünsdorf, an Ortsteil of the town of Zossen.
