= Wenddorf =

- Ortsteil of Angern
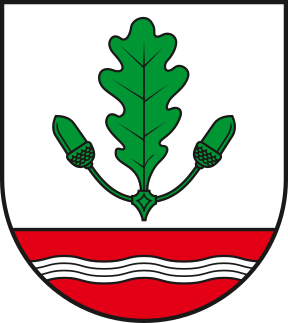
- Coat of arms
- Interactive map of Wenddorf
- Location within Germany Location within Saxony-Anhalt
- Coordinates: 52°23′N 11°45′E
- Country: Germany
- State: Saxony-Anhalt
- District: Börde
- Municipality: Angern

Area
  - Total: 6.51 km^{2} (2.51 sq mi)
- Elevation: 37 m (121 ft)

Population (2006-12-31)
  - Total: 117
  - Density: 18.0/km^{2} (46.5/sq mi)
- Time zone: UTC+01:00 (CET)
  - Summer (DST): UTC+02:00 (CEST)
- Postal codes: 39517
- Dialling codes: 039363
- Website: www.elbe-heide.de

Wenddorf is a village and a former municipality in the Börde district in Saxony-Anhalt, Germany. Since 1 January 2010, it is part of the municipality Angern.
