= Sperenberg Airfield =

Former military airbase in Brandenburg, Germany

Coordinates: 52°08′13.21″N 13°18′25.4″E

Sperenberg Airfield was a military air base located near the town of Sperenberg in Brandenburg, Germany. It served as a primary Soviet logistics hub and was the departure point for Erich Honecker’s flight to Moscow in 1991.

== History ==
The site in the forests was originally developed for the Prussian Army. It was used as a military laboratory and testing site, part of the Kummersdorf complex. After the unification of Germany, it continued as a military test site, and a training site for railway pioneers.

At the start of World War II, it again was developed as a military testing and development facility, and was the first site where Wernher von Braun tested his rockets, before the research was moved to Peenemünde.

The site was overrun by the Red Army in May 1945, after which it was greatly abandoned, later used for occasional training by both the Soviet Army and the East German Army.

== Construction ==
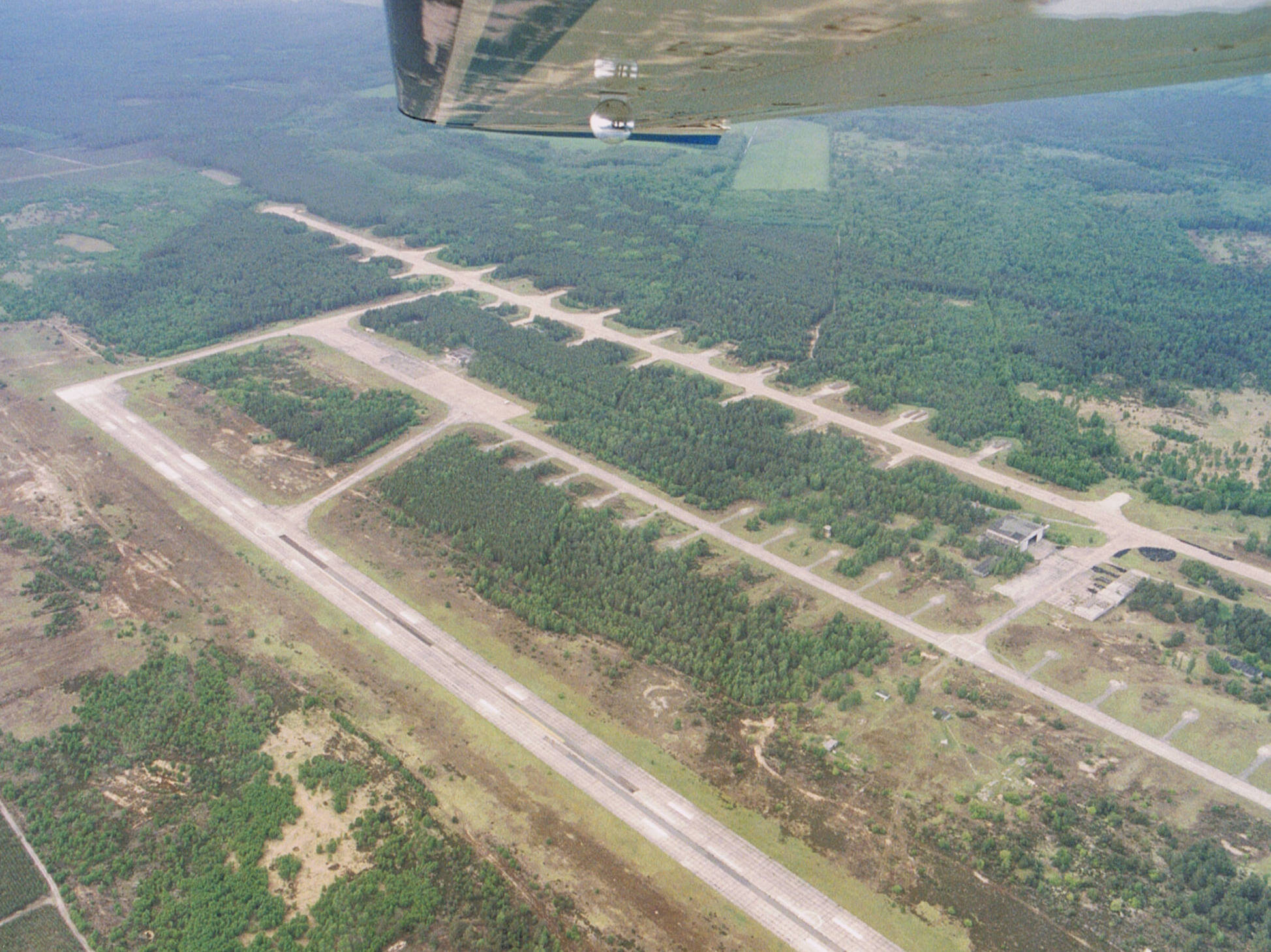
The now abandoned but extensive facilities of Sperenberg Airfield, as seen from the air in 2002.

In the late 1950s, the Soviet Army began looking for a military airfield suitable for use by heavy transport planes required by the army and logistics corps. There was an investigation of possible locations in Drewitz, Rangsdorf and Sperenberg. After an intense battle with the German Democratic Republic, financing was agreed after they had reached agreement on the sharing of costs. This was in part on removing the need to expand the existing Berlin-Schönefeld Airport for dual-military use.

Construction was undertaken in three phases from 1958:

- Phase 1: 1958–1960: base layout, undertaken by VEB Spezialbau Potsdam with the help of selected inmates from Brandenburg-Görden Prison
- Phase 2: 1960s: Construction by Soviet troops of a command post bunker for use by the 226th Transportfliegerregiments. It had dimensions of 28x16 metres
- Phase 3: 1972-1974: Using civilian contractors, they added: additional parking ramps to the northwest (built by VEB Highways); centrally placed hangars; combined east and central electrical facilities. After the completion of these works in May 1974, they: extended the concrete runway to 2,500 metres (8,200 ft); created an additional parallel grass runway; created an additional four taxiways with north–south orientation, and two taxiways parallel to the runway in east–west orientation, which led to the extended passenger terminal

== Operations ==
Sperenberg was as a key location for the Soviet forces in East Germany. The airport was a designated transport airfield, and so was equipped with heavy transport types such as the Ilyushin Il-76 and Antonov An-22. The airfield was the sole operational site of a single Antonov An-26L (14 Orange, c/n 00607), used for airfield and NAVAID calibration. The airfield also housed attack helicopters for defensive purposes, as well as out-stationed and transitting bombers. In 1990, attached stationed units included:

- 39th Independent Reconnaissance Aviation Otriyad (roughly "Detachment")(ORAO): Ilyushin Il-20, Ilyushin Il-22
- 113th Independent Helicopter Squadron (OVE): Mil Mi-6, Mil Mi-8, Mil Mi-9, Mil Mi-24. Withdrawn to Vorotinsk, Kaluga Oblast, in July 1994.
- 226th Independent Mixed Aviation Regiment (226th OSAP): Antonov An-12, Antonov An-24, Antonov An-26, Tupolev Tu-134. One of the major units of the 16th Air Army.

== Civilian facilities ==
Although originally it had a series of attached barracks, garages and stores buildings solely for military use, it eventually expanded to a designated Soviet military town with a population in excess of 5,000. The site was eventually equipped with a theatre, cinema, shops, bakery, schools, kindergarten, hospitals and other civilian facilities.

While air transport across the Soviet Union was accessible to on-duty military personnel and their families while in transit to/from the base, for non-military use there was a daily train service to and from Potsdam and onwards directly to Moscow.

== Closure ==
After the 1989/1990 German reunification, the Soviet Army agreed to return all former bases to the new German Federal Government by the end of 1994. However, after the issuing of arrest warrants for the former Head of State of East Germany Erich Honecker in 1991, he spent his last night on German soil at Sperenberg before being flown to Moscow the next day.

The site was returned to the Federal Republic of Germany in 1994, who handed it over to the state of Brandenburg in 2009.

== Expanding Berlin-Brandenburg ==
In the early 1990s, the site was explored as a potential expansion or replacement for Berlin Brandenburg Airport, gaining the site national attention. While supporters liked the existing airfield infrastructure and underlined the hidden forest location and associated low noise, critics saw too great a distance from the federal capital as a negative criterion. A further argument against Sperenberg was the potential to expand Leipzig/Halle Airport. With high-speed rail connections to both via ICE from the Berlin area, both airports were in strong competition. However, although the commissioned studies - especially the extensive environmental impact assessment (EIA) as part of the regional planning process - came to the clear decision that Sperenberg was the best location, the federal parliament eventually choose Berlin Schönefeld Airport as the future location.

== Current status ==
In 2009, the 2400 hectares of land covering the airfield and the surrounding former developments were handed back from the Federal Government to the state of Brandenburg. The site, open to the public and hence widely vandalised, is rented out to many commercial companies for use as an open air testing facility, included railed-based test tracks installed by both TUV and DEKRA for crash tests.

In December 2007, the state of Brandenburg estimated the site value at €8.750M with annual income of €500,000. Further, it was estimated that if the site were to be redeveloped, that the costs would be: demolition of €24M; remediation of €11.258M; development and marketing of €3M; and administration of €7M; totalling €45.271M in outgoings. This would bring the land value up to €9.25M. The state hence in 2009 applied to the Federal Government for a transfer of €36M in development fees.
