= Angern =

- Municipality
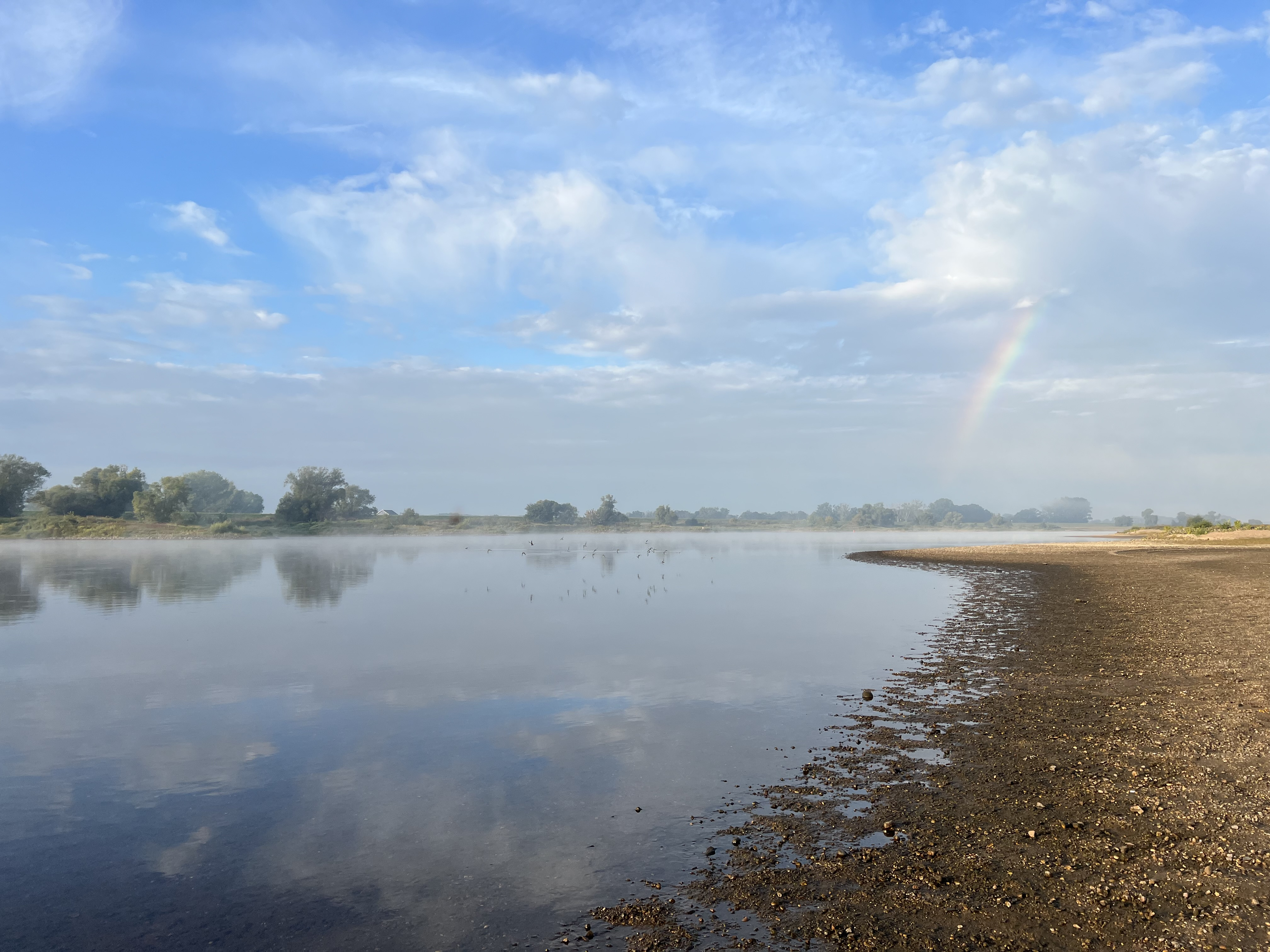

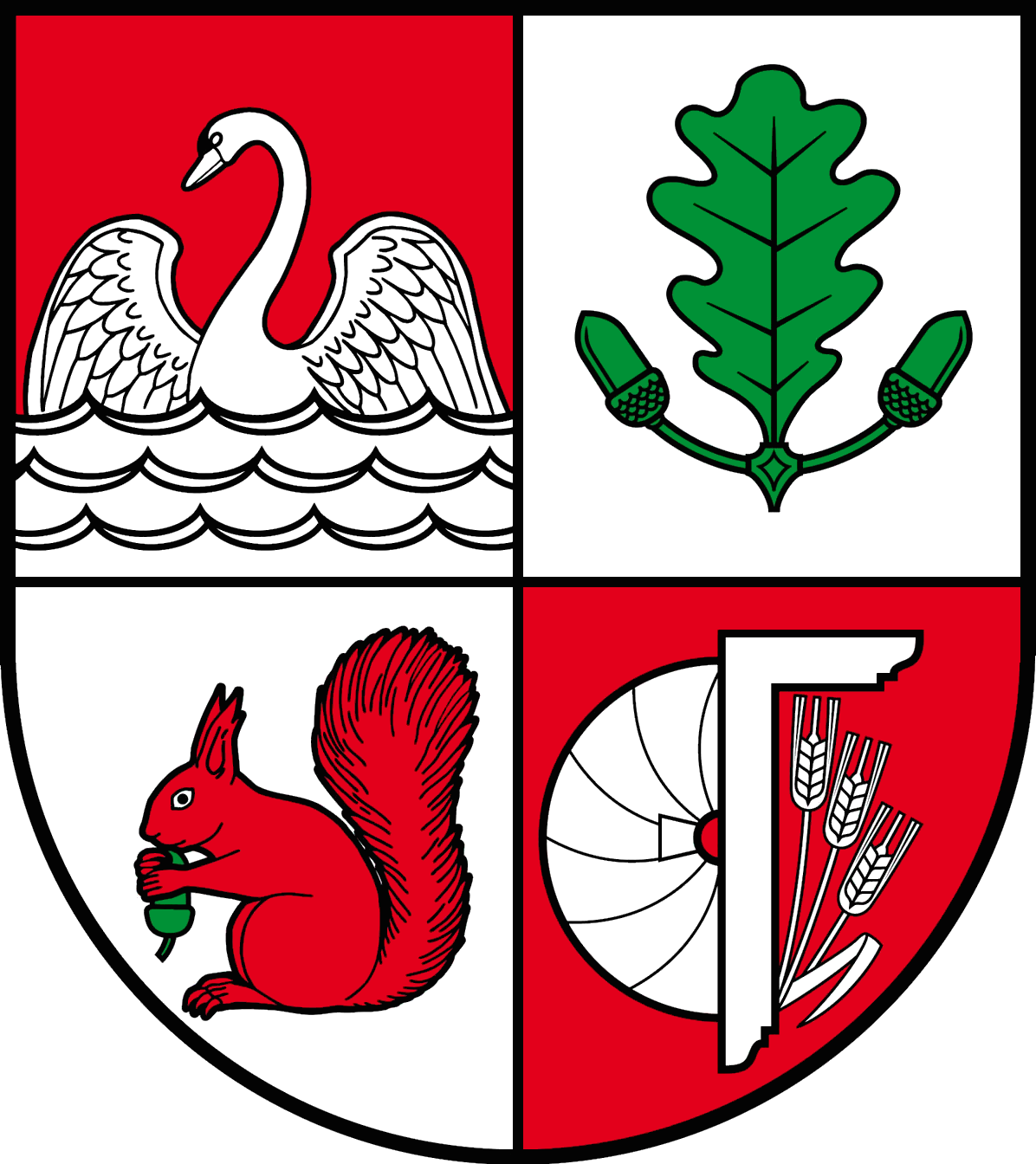
- Coat of arms

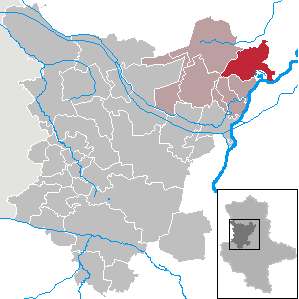
- Location of Angern within Börde district
- Interactive map of Angern
- Location within Germany Location within Saxony-Anhalt
- Coordinates: 52°21′23″N 11°44′8″E
- Country: Germany
- State: Saxony-Anhalt
- District: Börde
- Municipal assoc.: Elbe-Heide

Government
  - Mayor (2019–26): Egbert Fitsch

Area
  - Total: 64.21 km^{2} (24.79 sq mi)
- Elevation: 43 m (141 ft)

Population (2025-12-31)
  - Total: 1,890
  - Density: 29.4/km^{2} (76.2/sq mi)
- Time zone: UTC+01:00 (CET)
  - Summer (DST): UTC+02:00 (CEST)
- Postal codes: 39326, 39517
- Dialling codes: 039363, 039366, 03935
- Vehicle registration: BK
- Website: www.gemeindeangern.de

Angern (German pronunciation: [ˈaŋɐn]) is a municipality in the Börde district in Saxony-Anhalt, Germany. On 1 January 2010 it absorbed the former municipalities Bertingen, Mahlwinkel and Wenddorf. The municipality consists of the Ortsteile (municipal divisions) Angern, Bertingen, Mahlwinkel, Wenddorf and Zibberick.

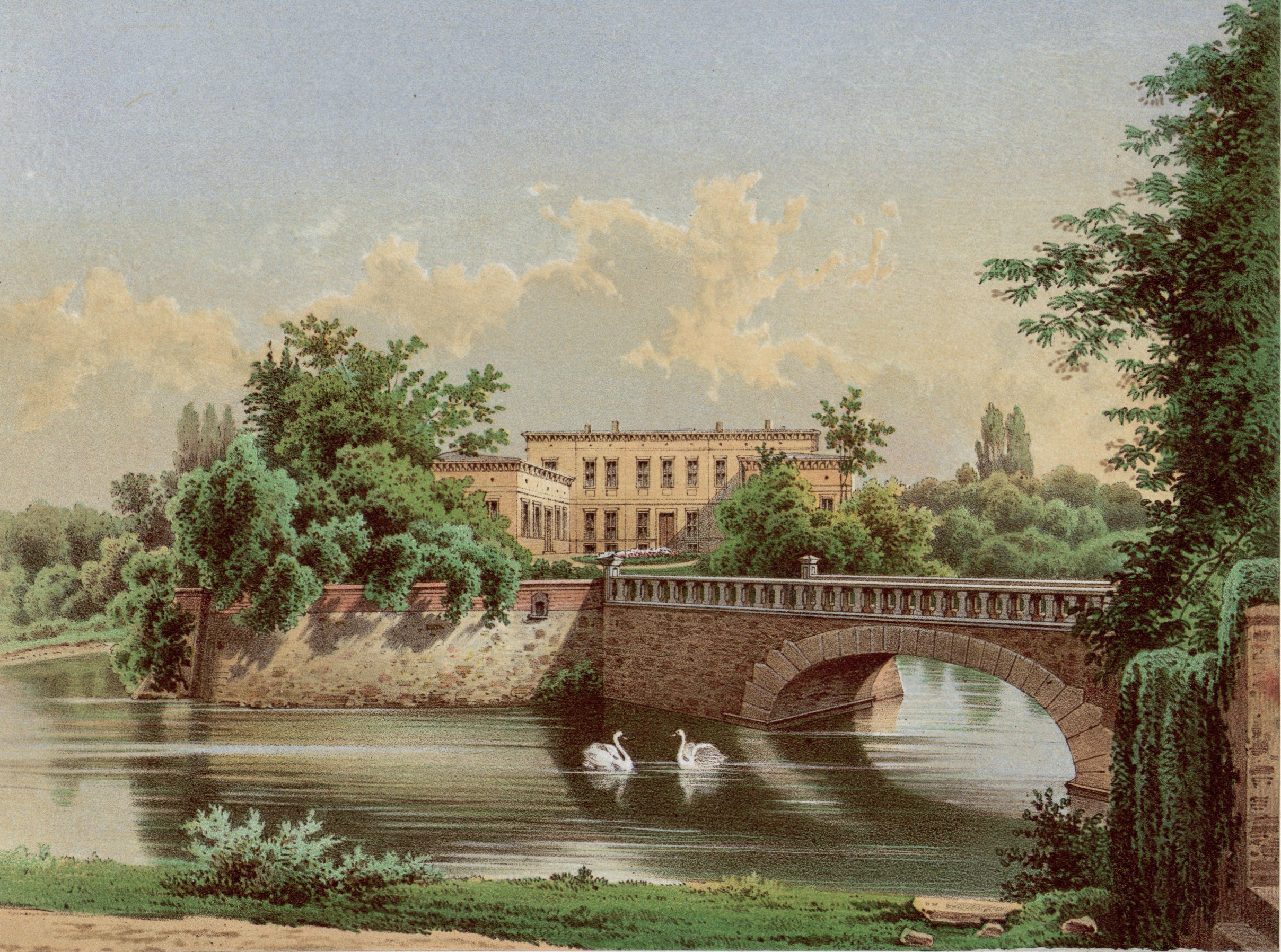
Palace Angern around 1860, Edition by Alexander Duncker
