= Zossen =

- Town
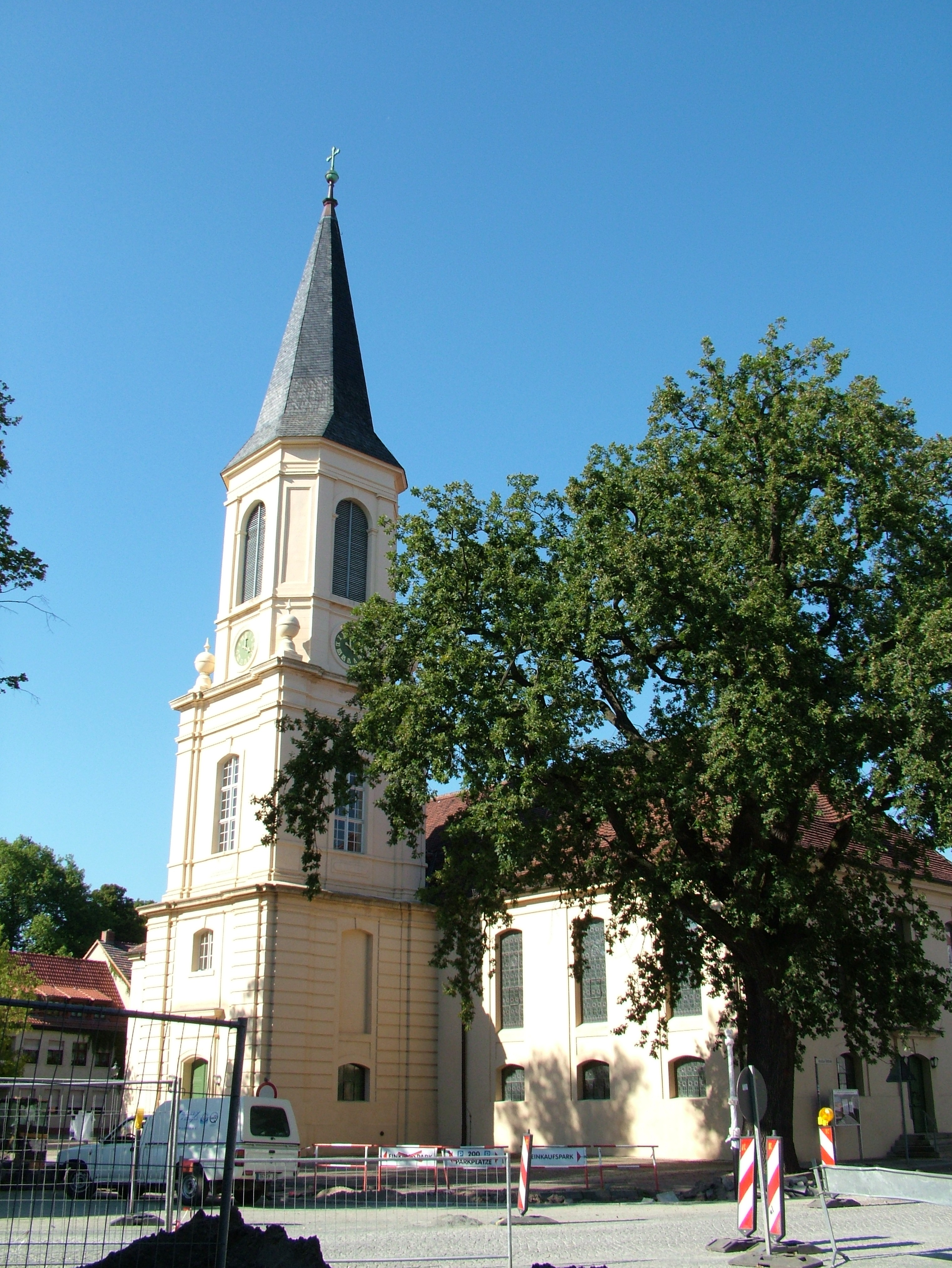
- Church of the Holy Trinity

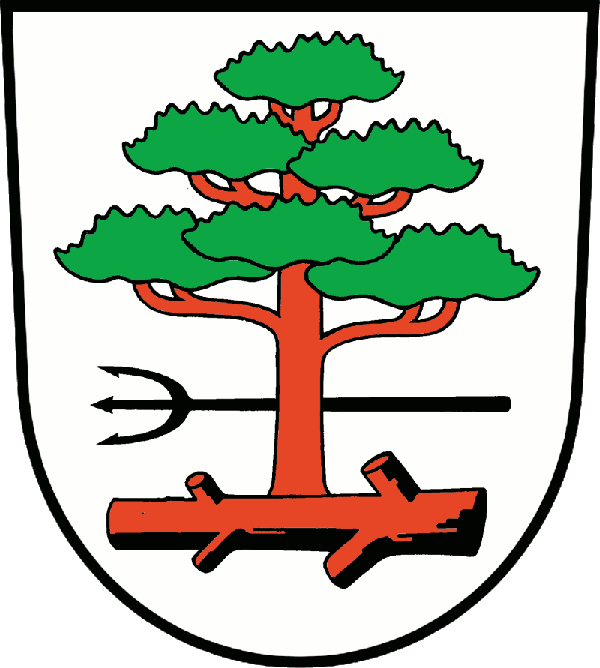
- Coat of arms

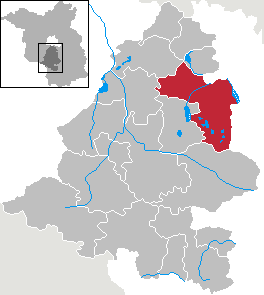
- Location of Zossen within Teltow-Fläming district
- Interactive map of Zossen
- Location within Germany Location within Brandenburg
- Coordinates: 52°13′00″N 13°26′59″E
- Country: Germany
- State: Brandenburg
- District: Teltow-Fläming
- Subdivisions: 7 Orts- und 9 Gemeindeteile

Government
  - Mayor (2019–27): Wiebke Schwarzweller (FDP)

Area
  - Total: 180.39 km^{2} (69.65 sq mi)
- Elevation: 38 m (125 ft)

Population (2025-12-31)
  - Total: 21,558
  - Density: 119.51/km^{2} (309.52/sq mi)
- Time zone: UTC+01:00 (CET)
  - Summer (DST): UTC+02:00 (CEST)
- Postal codes: 15806
- Dialling codes: 03377
- Vehicle registration: TF
- Website: zossen.de

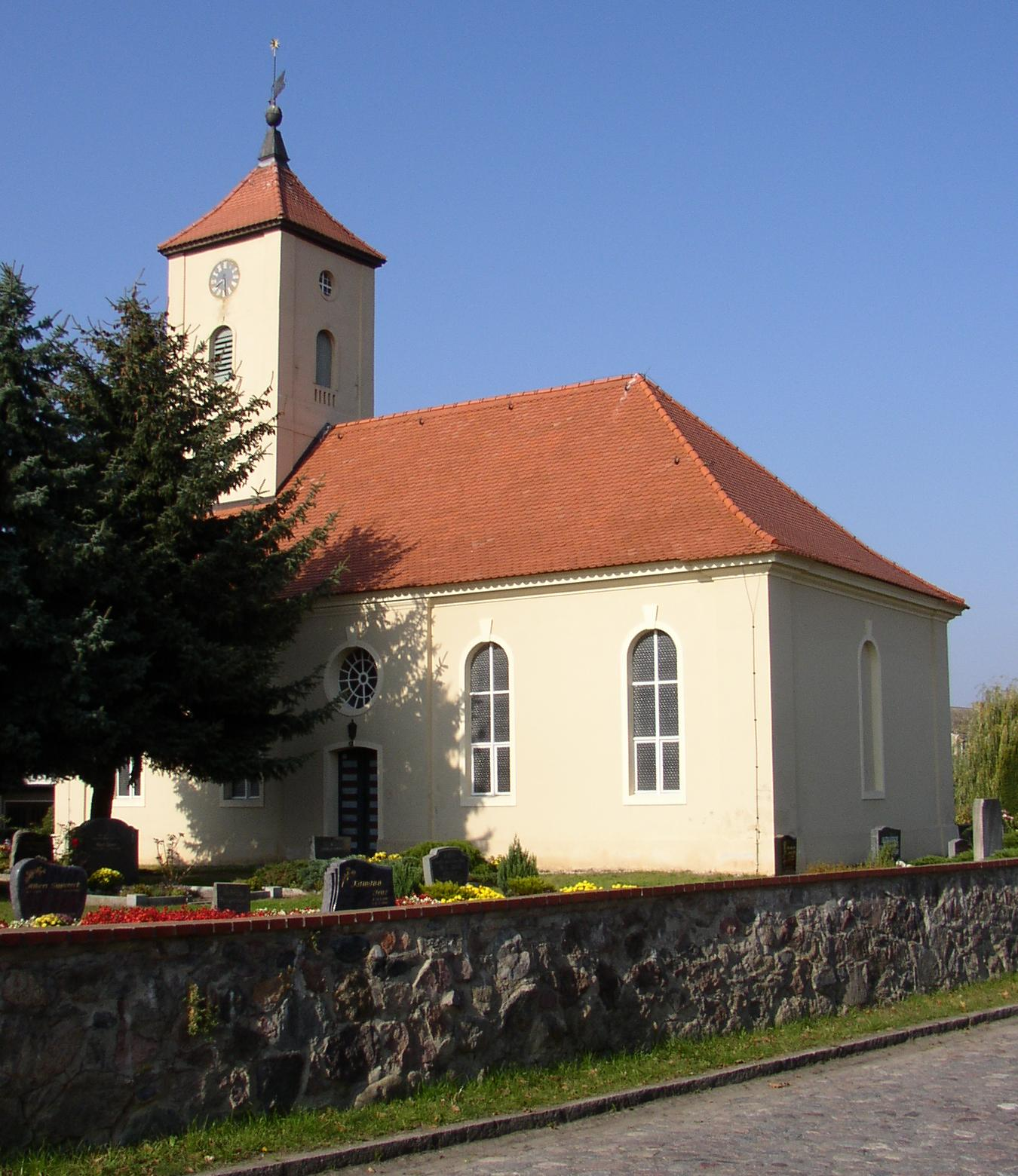
Church in Nunsdorf

Zossen (German pronunciation: [ˈtsɔsn̩]; Upper Sorbian: Sosny, pronounced [ˈsɔsnɨ]) is a German town in the district of Teltow-Fläming in Brandenburg, about 30 kilometres (20 mi) south of Berlin, and next to the B96 highway. Zossen consists of several smaller municipalities, which were grouped in 2003 to form the city.

== Geography ==
Since the 2003 municipal reform, Zossen consists of the following districts and municipalities:

- Glienick
- Horstfelde
- Schünow
- Werben
- Kallinchen
- Nächst Neuendorf
- Nunsdorf
- Schöneiche
- Wünsdorf
- Funkenmühle
- Lindenbrück
- Neuhof
- Waldstadt
- Zesch am See
- Zossen
- Dabendorf

== History ==
Zossen, like many places in Brandenburg, was originally a Slavic settlement. Its name (Upper Sorbian: Sosny) may derive from "Sosna", meaning pine, a tree quite common in the region.

In 1875, Zossen railway station opened on the railway line from Berlin to Dresden and the Prussian military railway to the artillery range at Kummersdorf-Gut in present-day Am Mellensee. Between 1901 and 1904, Zossen adopted the use of various high-speed vehicles, such as electric locomotives and trams, for transportation to and from Berlin-Marienfelde. These vehicles were powered by an alternating current of 15 kV and used a variable frequency. The power was transmitted by three overhead lines arranged one above the other.

=== Imperial German Army garrison ===
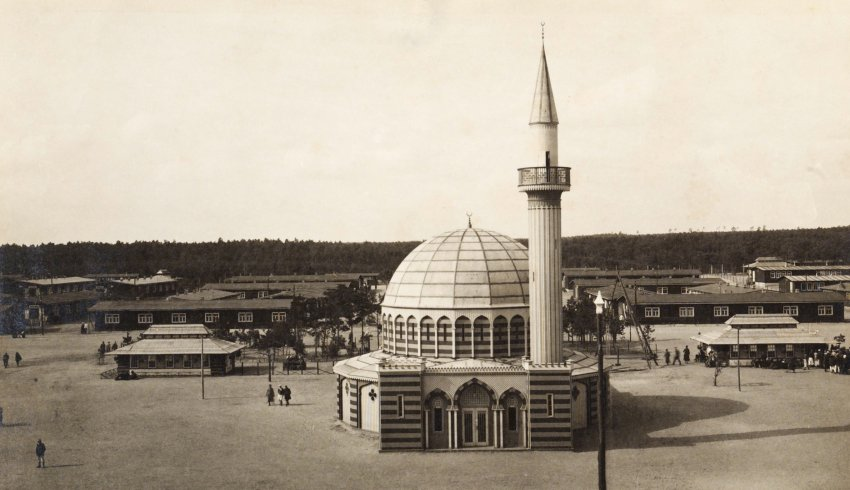
Mosque view in the POW camp: In July 1915, the first mosque on German soil was erected in the so-called Crescent Camp Wünsdorf (Halbmondlager Wünsdorf). The POW camp held enemy soldiers of the Islamic faith, allowing them to practice their religion in the mosque. The construction was financed by the Prussian Army. (Photo circa 1915)

In 1910, an artillery proving ground and garrison of the Imperial German Army were established in the Waldstadt section of the Wünsdorf community, a site that remains in use today. During World War I, it housed several prisoner-of-war camps, including the "Crescent Camp" (Halbmondlager), which was designated for Muslim soldiers who had fought for the Triple Entente. Notably, the first mosque in Germany was erected here. The mosque's wooden construction, financed by the Prussian Army, featured a 25-meter high minaret that was built in just five weeks in July 1915. The camp operated from 1915 until 1917, serving as a showcase for Germany's war propaganda. It was designed not only to display the supposed humane treatment of prisoners but also to persuade them to join the Central Powers' cause. Named after the structure, the adjacent Mosque Street (Moscheestraße) has kept its name to this day.

=== German Reichswehr complex ===
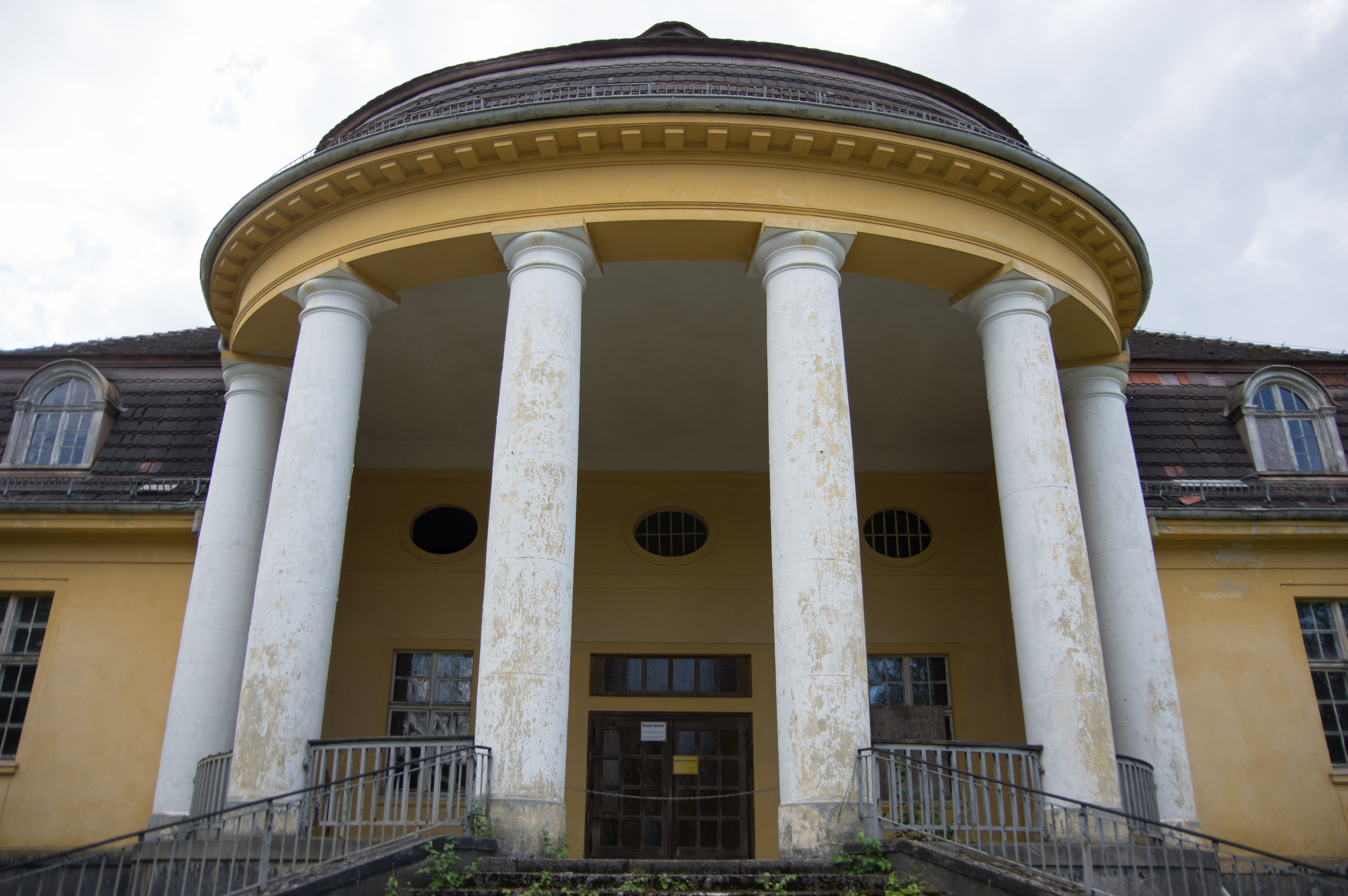
The entrance to the former Imperial Gymnastics Gymnasium (Kaiserliche Turnanstalt) and later German Army Sports School Wünsdorf, built between 1914 and 1916. Today, the buildings are falling into disrepair.

The military complex in Wünsdorf continued to be used after the end of the First World War in 1918. On 1 October 1924, the first German Armed Forces (Reichswehr) military sports courses were initiated at the Imperial Gymnastics Gymnasium (Kaiserliche Turnanstalt) as part of the newly founded popular sports movement (Volkssportbewegung), which ran nationwide until 1933. In 1934, it was converted into the Army Sports School Wünsdorf, promoting competitive sports in the German Reichswehr. For the 1936 Summer Olympics in Berlin, German athletes were prepared here, while athletes from other nations were accommodated in the Olympic Village. The first director of the Reichswehr sports school, from 1919 to 1924, was Hans Surén, a German army officer, instructor, sports author, and advocate of the early Freikörperkultur (naturism) movement in Germany. Additional barracks, a hospital, and horse stables were later constructed.

=== World War II bunkers ===
From 1939 to 1945, during World War II, Wünsdorf served as the largest and most advanced German military headquarters. Underground and overground structures housed three complexes:

- the signals intelligence (SIGINT) bunker Zeppelin
- Maybach I, the site of the German Army's Supreme High Command (OKH)
- Maybach II, the headquarters of the German Wehrmacht (OKW)

=== Soviet occupation and military base ===
After World War II, the area became the site of a Soviet military base in East Germany known as the "House of Officers" or "Lenin City", the largest outside Russia, accommodating up to 75,000 Soviet men, women, and children with daily trains to Moscow. Soviet troops remained until their withdrawal following the German reunification in August 1994. Since then, the area has returned to civilian use as the Wünsdorf-Waldstadt book and bunker town, founded in 1998. Although much of it lies abandoned, evidence of Soviet occupation remains visible. By late 2019, roughly 1,700 apartments had been converted from the old barracks, with another 700 planned for subsequent years.

A 2017 news report indicates that, at its peak, the military base was home to approximately 75,000 Soviet people, with access to stores, schools, and leisure centres. After the base was abandoned, authorities discovered "98,300 rounds of ammunition, 47,000 pieces of ordnance, 29.3 tonnes of munitions and rubbish, including chemicals... houses were full of domestic appliances".

While new uses have not been found for the installations and bunkers of the unmodified areas of the military base, they are somewhat maintained, and there are various guided tours, exhibits, and events. Some parts remain off-limits.

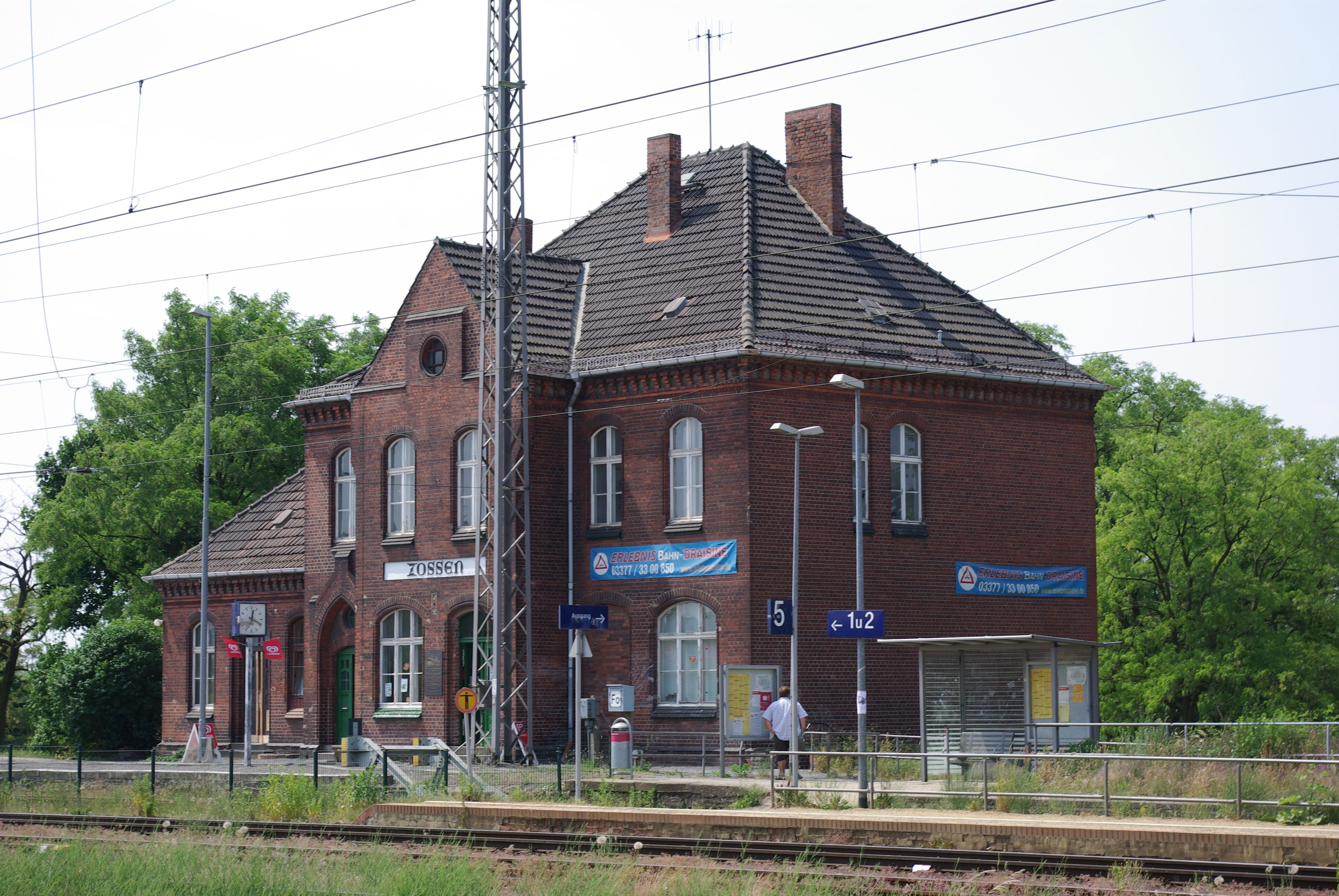
Zossen station

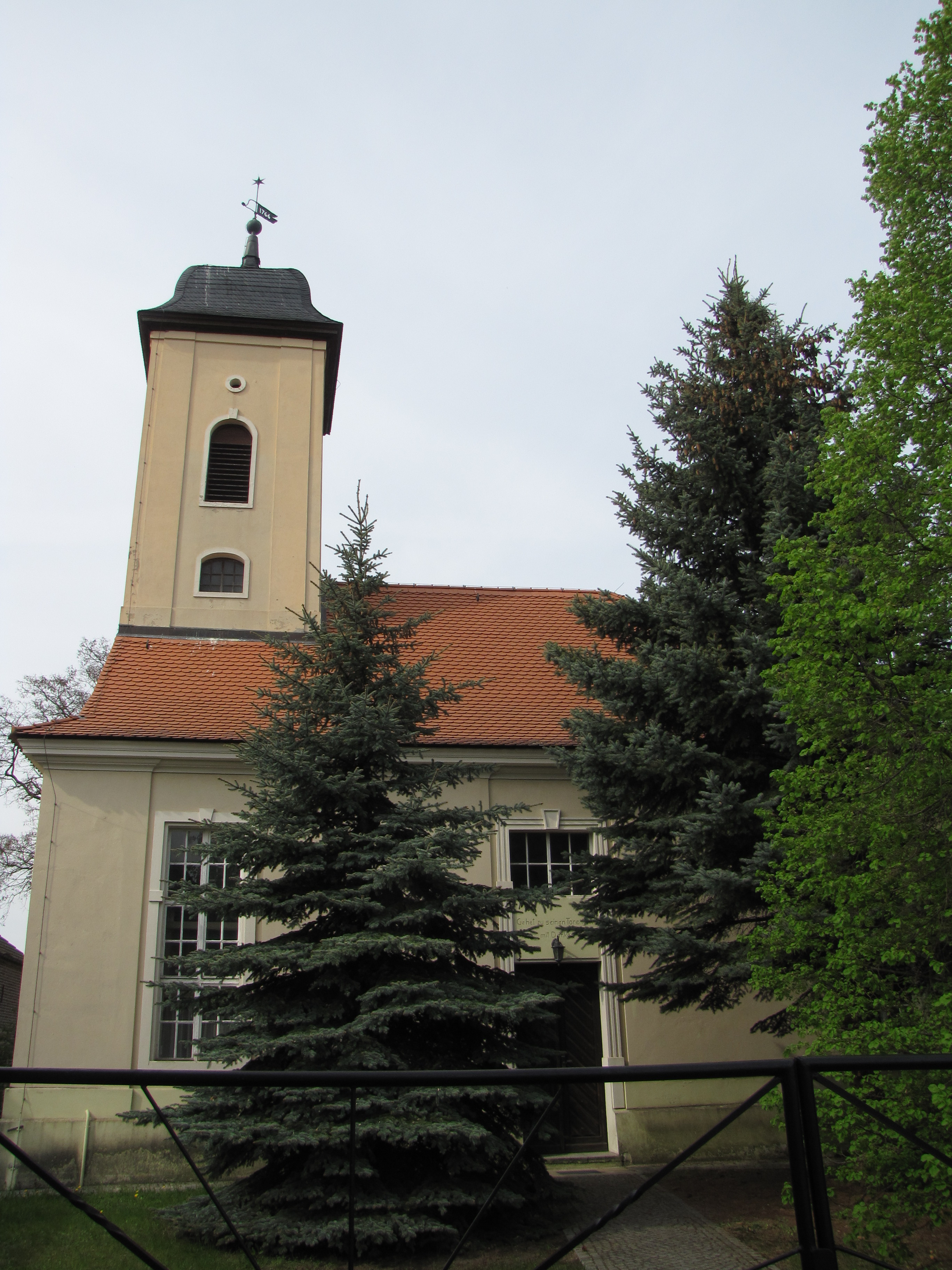
Church in Schünow

=== Timeline ===
- 1809/1810: Kietz and the vineyards of Zossen are suburbanised
- 1885: Monument to the fallen soldiers of the 1864, 1866, and 1870 wars is erected in Kietz
- 1906: School on Kirchplatz is expanded
- 1910: Military area between Zossen and Wünsdorf is developed
- 1915: First mosque built on German soil in the POW camp
- 1919: Reichswehr military sports school
- 1932: Flyers of the town councillor and deacon Emil Phillip regarding the threatening change in the Protestant community and the city Zossen
- 1933: As a result of the National Socialists' rise to power, Socialists and Communists in Zossen are arrested by SS troops and are held in the school on Kirchplatz. Emil Phillip is removed from his post, upon the order of Pastor Eckerts
- 1934: Expansion of the town hall
- 1939: The military zone in Zossen is developed into military headquarters
- 1945: The Red Army captures the military headquarters
- 1956: The city park is created
- 1992: The "Alter Krug" Zossen society is founded
- 1994: Formation of the administrative district of Teltow-Fläming from the old districts of Jüterbog, Luckenwalde, and Zossen
- 1996: 450th anniversary of Prince Elector Joachim II's awarding of rights and privileges to Zossen
- 1998: Wünsdorf Book Town declared, the only book town in Germany – though Mühlbeck-Friedersdorf, which started in 1997, claims to be the first book town in Germany.

== Demography ==
Population since 1875 within the current borders (blue line: population; dotted line: normalized population of Brandenburg; grey background: time of Nazi rule; red background: time of communist rule)

Population 2005–2018 (blue lines) and projections to 2030 (dotted lines) from 2005 (yellow line), 2017 (velvet line) and 2020 (green line), including census in 2011

Zossen: Population development
within the current boundaries (2017)

Year	Pop.	±% p.a.
1875	7,335	—
1890	8,549	+1.03%
1910	10,611	+1.09%
1925	13,012	+1.37%
1933	14,231	+1.13%
1939	18,173	+4.16%
1946	17,000	−0.95%
1950	16,507	−0.73%
1964	13,834	−1.25%
1971	13,368	−0.49%
1981	12,879	−0.37%
1985	12,795	−0.16%
1989	12,502	−0.58%
1990	12,282	−1.76%
1991	12,241	−0.33%

Year	Pop.	±% p.a.
1992	12,193	−0.39%
1993	12,108	−0.70%
1994	12,441	+2.75%
1995	13,087	+5.19%
1996	13,612	+4.01%
1997	14,289	+4.97%
1998	15,108	+5.73%
1999	15,750	+4.25%
2000	16,310	+3.56%
2001	16,414	+0.64%
2002	16,772	+2.18%
2003	16,958	+1.11%
2004	17,063	+0.62%
2005	17,183	+0.70%
2006	17,321	+0.80%

Year	Pop.	±% p.a.
2007	17,441	+0.69%
2008	17,477	+0.21%
2009	17,590	+0.65%
2010	17,606	+0.09%
2011	17,392	−1.22%
2012	17,465	+0.42%
2013	17,600	+0.77%
2014	17,657	+0.32%
2015	17,905	+1.40%
2016	18,115	+1.17%
2017	18,915	+4.42%
2018	19,403	+2.58%
2019	19,912	+2.62%
2020	20,182	+1.36%

== Mayors ==
- Hans-Jürgen Lüders (SPD) 1993–2003
- Michaela Schreiber: 2003-2019
- Wiebke Schwarzweller: since 2019

== Notable people ==
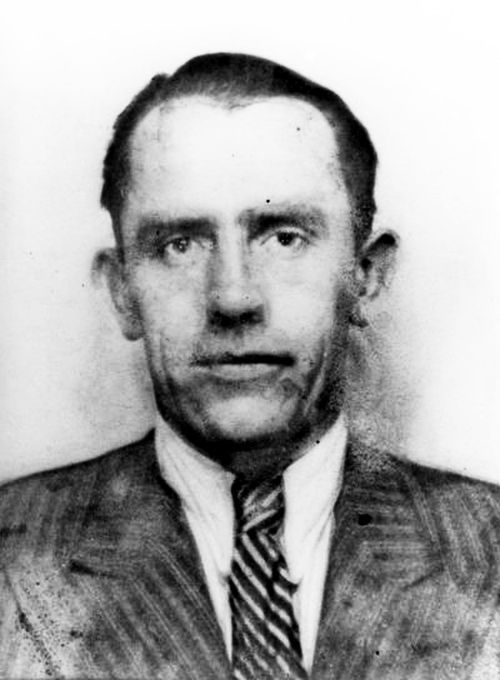
Walter Budeus

- Karl Friedrich August Lehmann (1843–1893), stenographer and inventor of the Stenotachygraphie shorthand system
- Frieda Kassen (1895–1970), politician (SPD)
- Walter Budeus (1902–1944), Communist and resistance fighter
- Roy Präger (born 1971), football player
- Daniel Freiherr von Lützow (born 1974), politician

== See also ==
- Großer Wünsdorfer See
- List of Soviet military sites in Germany
