= Oberkommando des Heeres =

Army High Command of the Wehrmacht

Army High Command
- Oberkommando des Heeres
- Command flag from 1938 to 1942
- Founded: 1935
- Disbanded: 23 May 1945
- Country: Nazi Germany
- Branch: German Army
- Type: High Command
- Part of: Armed Forces High Command (Oberkommando der Wehrmacht)
- Headquarters: Maybach I, Wünsdorf
- Nickname: OKH

Commanders
- Commander-in-Chief: See list
- Chief of the General Staff: See list

Insignia
- Command flag 1936–38

- Command flag 1938–42

The Oberkommando des Heeres (lit. 'Upper Command of the Army'; abbreviated OKH) was the high command of the Army of Nazi Germany. It was founded in 1935 as part of Adolf Hitler's rearmament of Germany. OKH was de facto the most important unit within the German war planning until the defeat at Moscow in December 1941.

During World War II, OKH had the responsibility of strategic planning of Armies and Army Groups. The General Staff of the OKH managed operational matters. Each German Army also had an Army High Command (Armeeoberkommando or AOK). The Armed Forces High Command (Oberkommando der Wehrmacht) then took over this function for theatres other than the Eastern front.

The OKH commander held the title of Commander-in-chief of the Army (Oberbefehlshaber des Heeres). After the Battle of Moscow, the OKH commander Field marshal Walther von Brauchitsch was removed from office, and Hitler appointed himself as Commander-in-Chief of the Army.

From 1938, OKH was, together with Oberkommando der Luftwaffe (transl. Air Force High Command) and Oberkommando der Marine (transl. Naval High Command) formally subordinated to the Oberkommando der Wehrmacht.

== OKH vs OKW ==
OKH had been independent until February 1938, when Hitler created the Oberkommando der Wehrmacht which, on paper, subordinated OKH to OKW. After a major crisis developed in the Battle of Moscow, von Brauchitsch was dismissed (partly because of his failing health), and Hitler appointed himself as head of the OKH. At the same time, he limited the OKH's authority to the Russian front, giving OKW direct authority over army units elsewhere. This enabled Hitler to declare that only he had complete awareness of Germany's strategic situation, should any general request a transfer of resources between the Russian front and another theatre of operations.

Although both OKW and OKH were headquartered in the Maybach complex in Nazi Germany, the functional and operational independence of both establishments were not lost on the respective staff during their tenure. Personnel at the compound remarked that even if Maybach 2 (the OKW complex) was completely destroyed, the OKH staff in Maybach 1 would scarcely notice. These camouflaged facilities, separated physically by a fence, also maintained structurally different mindsets towards their objectives.

On 28 April 1945 (two days before his suicide), Hitler formally subordinated OKH to OKW, giving the latter command of forces on the Eastern Front.

== Organisation ==
In 1944, these elements were subordinate to the OKH:

- C.-in-C. Reserve Army and Chief of Equipment (Chef der Heeresausrüstung und Befehlshaber des Ersatzheeres): Friedrich Fromm
- Chief of General Army Office (Chef des Allgemeines Heeresamt): Friedrich Olbricht
- Chief of Army Ordnance Office (Chef des Heereswaffenamtes): Emil Leeb
- Chief of Army Personnel Office (Chef des Heerespersonalamtes): Rudolf Schmundt
- Chief of Army Administrative Office (Chef des Heeresverwaltungsamtes): Herbert Osterkamp
- Army Propaganda and Public Relations Office: Hasso von Wedel – Albrecht Blau – Kurt Dittmar
- Inspector General of Armoured Troops (Generalinspekteur der Panzertruppen): Heinz Guderian
- General officer commanding for Engineers and Fortifications (General der Pioniere und Festungen): Alfred Jacob
- Inspector General for Officer Cadets (Generalinspektion des Militärerziehungs- und Bildungswesens): Karl-Wilhelm Specht

== List of commanders ==
=== Commander-in-Chief of the Army ===
The Commander-in-Chief of the Army (German: Oberbefehlshaber des Heeres) was the head of the OKH and the German Army during the years of the Nazi regime.

No.	Portrait	Commander-in-Chief of the German Army	Took office	Left office	Time in office	Ref.
1	Werner von Fritsch	Generaloberst; Werner von Fritsch (1880–1939)	1 February 1934	4 February 1938	4 years, 34 days	–
2	Walther von Brauchitsch	Generalfeldmarschall; Walther von Brauchitsch (1881–1948)	4 February 1938	19 December 1941	3 years, 318 days	–
3	Adolf Hitler	Führer und Reichskanzler; Adolf Hitler (1889–1945) (Note: Hitler assumed personal command of the OKH following Brauchitsch's dismissal in order to supervise Operation Barbarossa, the German-led invasion of the Soviet Union.)	19 December 1941	30 April 1945 †	3 years, 132 days	–
4	Ferdinand Schörner	Generalfeldmarschall; Ferdinand Schörner (1892–1973) (Note: One of Hitler's favorite military commanders who was named in Hitler's last will and testament as the new commander of the OKH. Meanwhile, the OKH was subordinated to the OKW of the Wehrmacht, under Field Marshal Wilhelm Keitel.)	30 April 1945	8 May 1945	8 days	–

=== Chief of General Staff of the OKH ===
Flag of Chief of the German Army General Staff

The Chiefs of the OKH General Staff (German: Chef des Generalstabes des Heeres) were:

No.	Portrait	Chief of the OKH General Staff	Took office	Left office	Time in office	Ref.
1	Ludwig Beck	Generaloberst; Ludwig Beck (1880–1944)	1 July 1935	31 August 1938	3 years, 61 days	
2	Franz Halder	Generaloberst; Franz Halder (1884–1972)	1 September 1938	24 September 1942	4 years, 23 days	
3	Kurt Zeitzler	Generaloberst; Kurt Zeitzler (1895–1963)	24 September 1942	10 June 1944	1 year, 260 days	
–	Adolf Heusinger	Generalleutnant; Adolf Heusinger (1897–1982); Acting (Note: Later served as the Inspector General of the Bundeswehr (1957–1961) and Chairman of the NATO Military Committee (1961–1964))	10 June 1944	21 July 1944	41 days	–
–	Heinz Guderian	Generaloberst; Heinz Guderian (1888–1954); Acting	21 July 1944	28 March 1945	250 days	
4	Hans Krebs	General der Infanterie; Hans Krebs (1898–1945) (Note: Committed suicide)	1 April 1945	2 May 1945 †	30 days	
–	Wilhelm Keitel	Generalfeldmarschall; Wilhelm Keitel (1882–1946); Acting	2 May 1945	13 May 1945	12 days	–
–	Alfred Jodl	Generaloberst; Alfred Jodl (1890–1946); Acting	13 May 1945	23 May 1945	10 days	–

== See also ==
- German general staff
- Glossary of World War II German military terms
- Maybach I and II
- Oberste Heeresleitung, the German Empire's highest army command during World War I
