= 337 Squadron =

337 Squadron may refer to:

- 337th Squadron (HAF), Greece
- No. 337 Squadron RNoAF, Norway
- 337th Air Control Squadron, United States
- 337th Airlift Squadron, United States
- 337th Flight Test Squadron, United States
- 337th Test and Evaluation Squadron, United States
