= Maybach I and II =

Pair of WWII-era bunkers in Germany

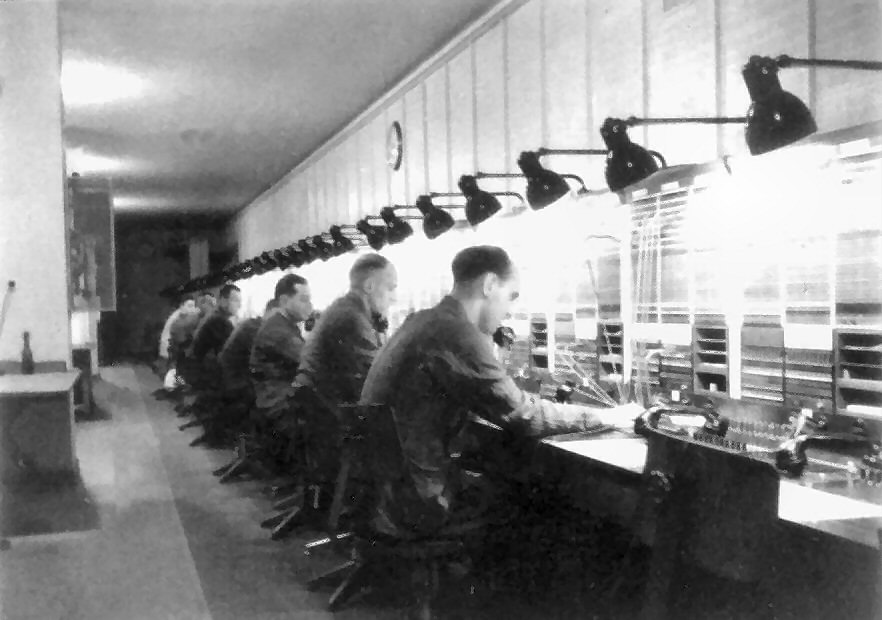
A telephone exchange of the complex, 1942

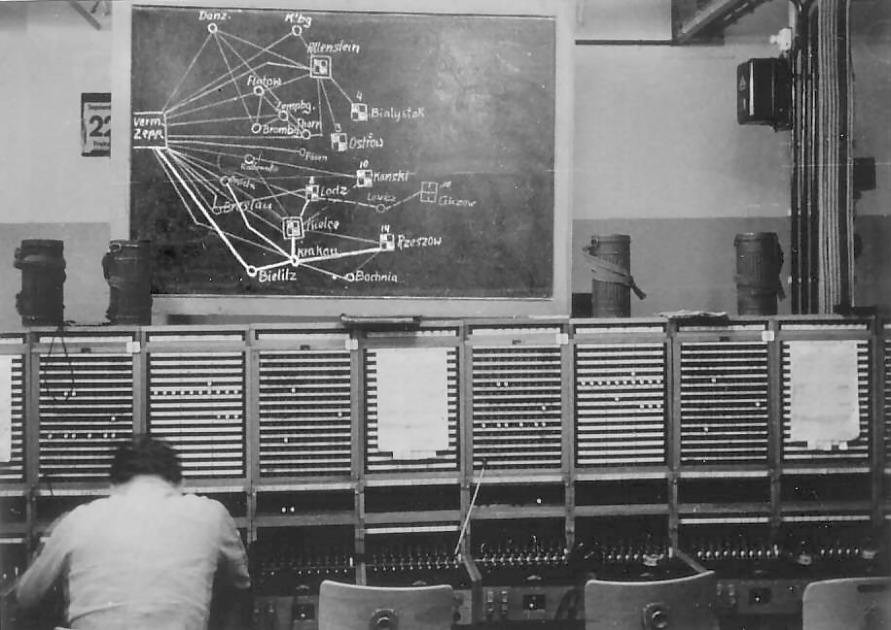
Telecommunication service Zeppelin on 22 September 1939 during the Polish campaign

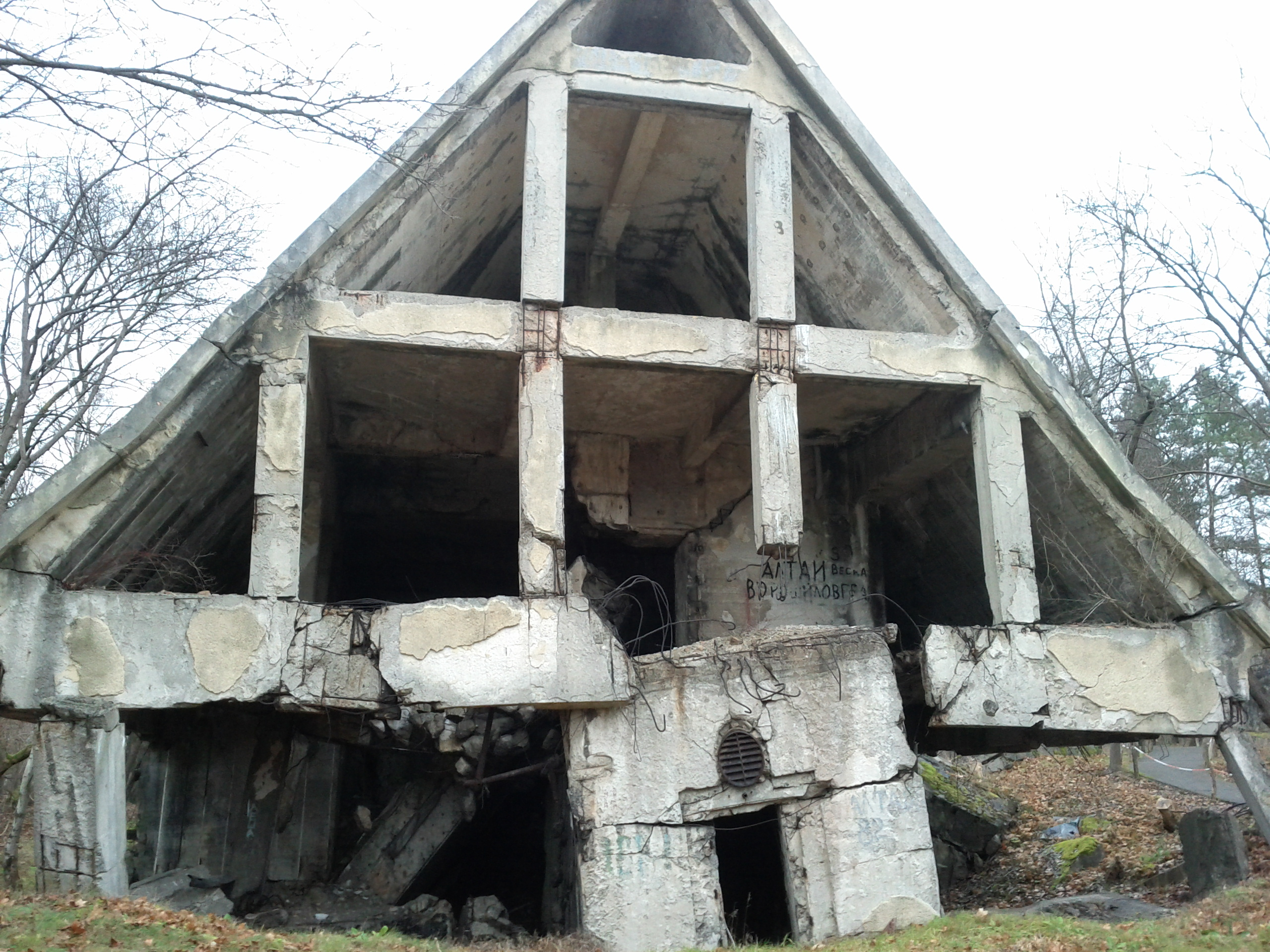
A bunker designed to look from the air like local housing

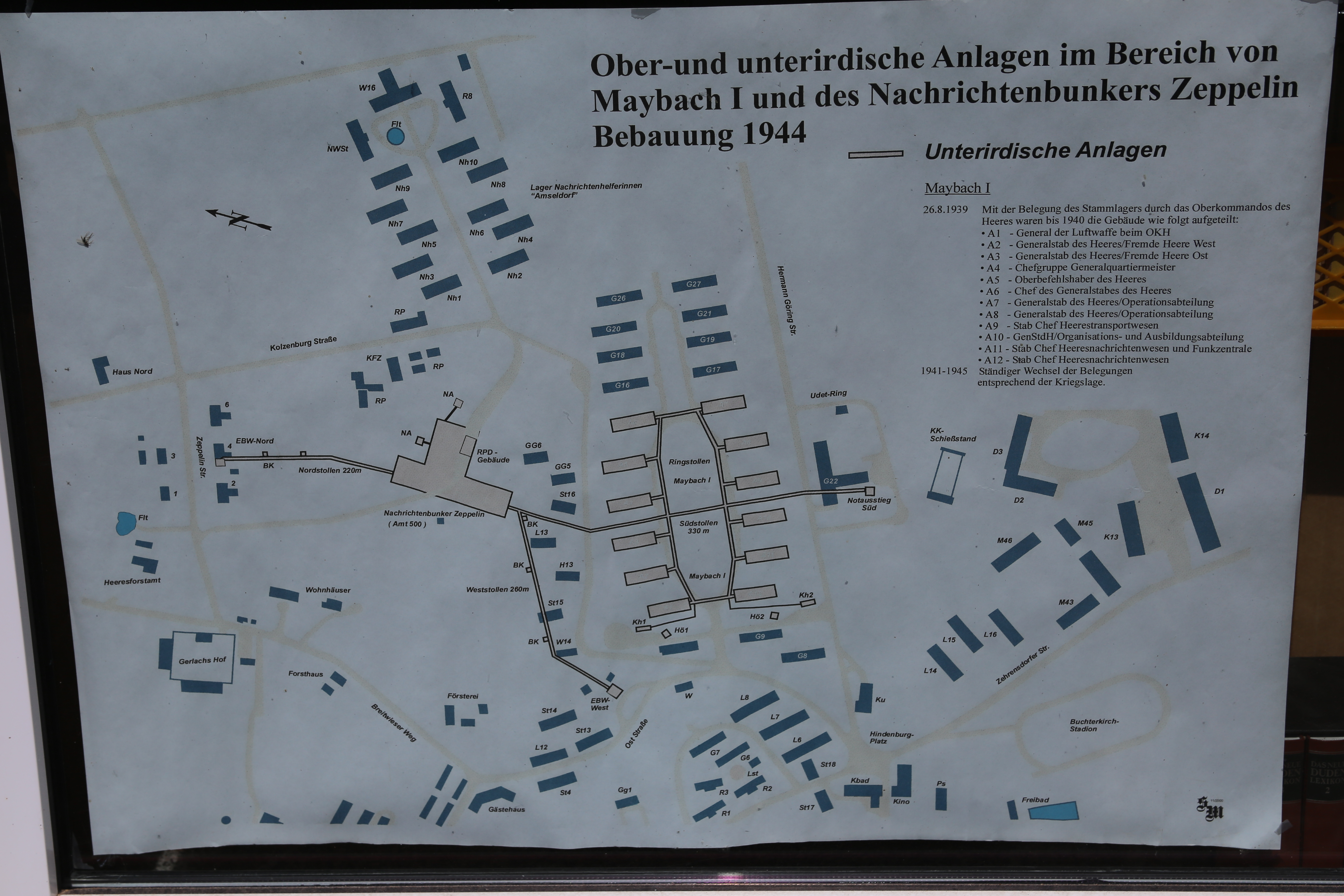
Photograph of a map of the layout of structures at the military complex at Zossen: Maybach I

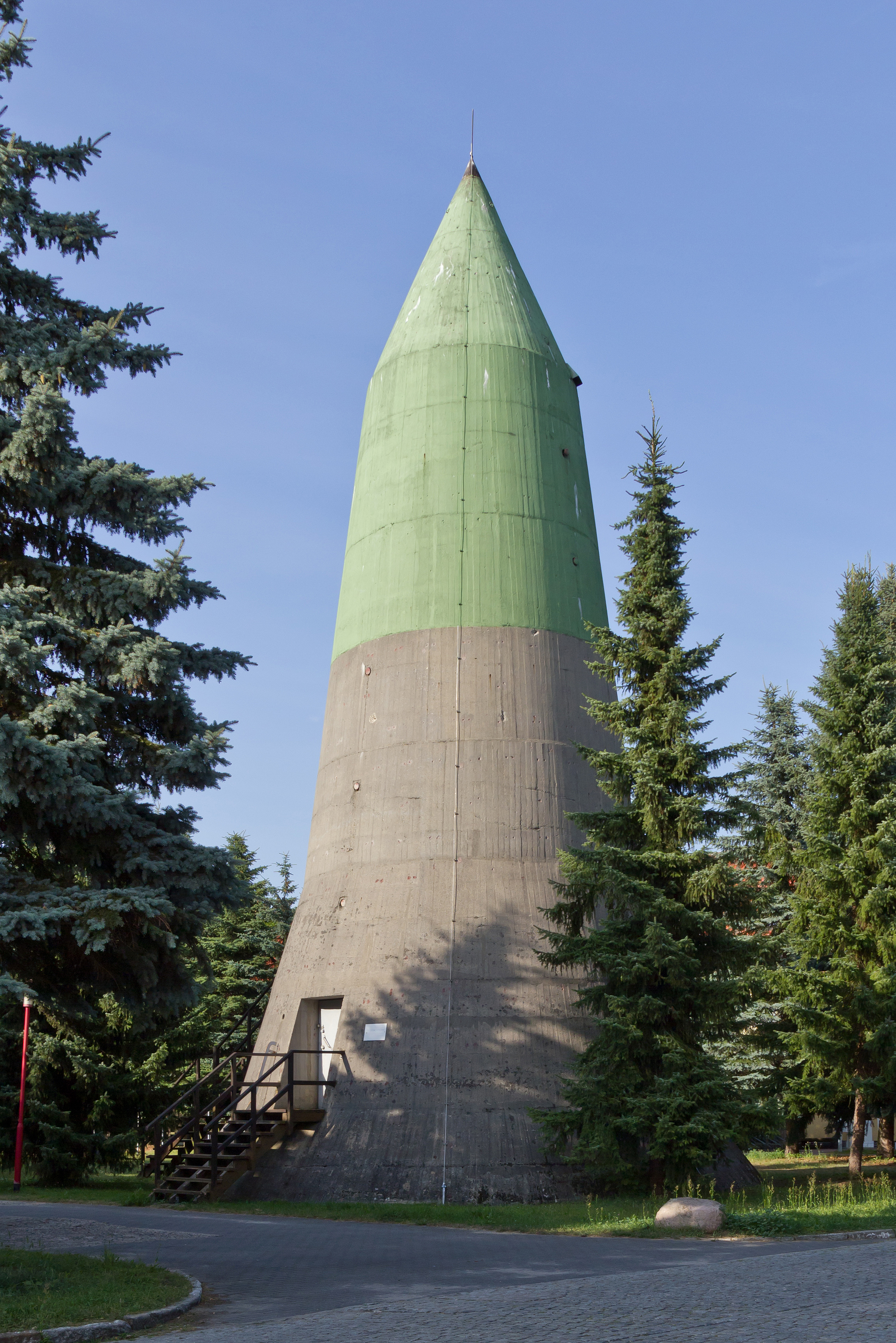
An air-raid shelter of the Spitzbunker type

Maybach I and II were a series of above- and below-ground bunkers built 20 kilometres south of Berlin in Wünsdorf near Zossen, Brandenburg, to house the High Command of the Army (in Maybach I) and the Supreme Command of the Armed Forces (in Maybach II) during the Second World War. Along with the military fortress complex Zossen, Maybach I and II were instrumental locations from which central planning for field operations of the Wehrmacht took place, and they provided a key connection between Berlin’s military and civilian leadership to the front lines of battle. The complex was named after the Maybach automobile engine.

- Location of Maybach I: 52.1934°N 13.4733°E
- Location of Maybach II: 52.1826°N 13.4741°E

== Zeppelin ==
The Zeppelin bunker was erected by the Reichspost on the orders of the Oberkommando der Wehrmacht at the end of the 1930s. The bunker was built between 1937 and 1939 in the area of the so-called Stalag (German: Stammlager) as a signal intelligence centre. The code name for the bunker was Amt 500, i.e., (Postal) Office 500.

The structure consisted of a two-lane longitudinal building with measurements of 117m × 22m with an associated three-storey annex measuring 57m × 40m. After several project changes, a third entrance was added in 1938. Called the Reich Post Building (German: Reichspostgebäude), it could be accessed by light trucks, directly above the extension with a stairwell and an elevator. A south tunnel (German: Südstollen) connected the bunker with Maybach I and II to the southwest.

== Maybach I ==
Maybach I was built beginning in 1937; by December 1939, it was fully operational. The complex consisted of twelve three-storey buildings above ground designed to look from the air like local housing, and two floors of interlinked bunkers with two-foot thick walls below. Deeper in the subterranean levels of Maybach I, there were wells for drinking water and plumbing, air-filter systems for protection against gas attacks, and diesel engines to keep the system operational. Later the site was further camouflaged by the use of netting.

== Maybach II ==
Maybach II was completed in 1940 and was of the same design as Maybach I, with eleven surface buildings.

Incriminating evidence left by the conspirators of the 20 July plot against Hitler was discovered at Maybach II in a safe at Zossen. Among the documents reportedly uncovered were excerpts from the diary of Wilhelm Canaris, conspiratorial correspondence between Abwehr agents, information on the secret negotiations between the Vatican and members of the originally planned coup d’état of 1938, the Oster conspiracy, and data on the resistance activities of Lutheran minister Dietrich Bonhoeffer.

== World War II ==
Between 15 and 17 January 1945, the Oberkommando des Heeres (High Command of the German Army – OKH) moved into Maybach I. The army general staff moved their quarters into Maybach II. During 1945 the site was heavily bombed both by the British and by the Americans; a raid on 15 March injured the Chief of the Army General Staff, Hans Krebs.

On 20 April the Soviet 3rd Armoured Guard Army threatened the HQ near Zossen. General Krebs asked Hitler for permission to leave and destroy the important items. By the time Krebs received permission, it was too late to destroy anything. At midday on 20 April the OKH evacuated to Eiche near Potsdam and the OKW to Krampnitz. The Soviets arrived in the afternoon, and found the site empty apart from four German soldiers.

== Cold War ==
The two Maybach bunkers were largely destroyed by the Soviet Armed Forces in late 1946, according to the stipulations of the four-power agreement on the occupation of Germany and an Allied Control Council order, although some buildings survived, including the almost entirely intact separate communications bunker Zeppelin. The Zeppelin bunker later formed part of the Soviet Cold war era installations in Wünsdorf under the name Ranet. Further bunker installations were subsequently added to house the central command and communications functions of the Soviet Army in the GDR. The area was demilitarised in 1994 when the last Russian troops left Germany.

== Preservation ==
The ruins of the above-ground bunker entrance houses remain. The area can be accessed by guided tours, and a museum in the Wünsdorf Book Town houses exhibits on the military history of the town and the bunker complexes. Some parts of the underground complex of Maybach I remain accessible through the ruins of the entrance buildings, together with the neighbouring communications bunker Zeppelin, while Maybach II has been nearly obliterated.

== In popular culture ==
The two camps are part of the plot of "The Experts" episode of the TV series Hogan's Heroes (season 6, episode 2, first broadcast September 27, 1970). A German officer who helped to set up the telecommunications facilities in the camps is wanted for execution by the Gestapo so he cannot reveal what he knows. Col. Hogan provides him with safe passage to London in return for his knowledge.
