= Lockwisch =

- Ortsteil of Schönberg
- Interactive map of Lockwisch
- Location within Germany Location within Mecklenburg-Vorpommern
- Coordinates: 53°49′N 10°52′E
- Country: Germany
- State: Mecklenburg-Vorpommern
- District: Nordwestmecklenburg
- Town: Schönberg

Area
  - Total: 13.97 km^{2} (5.39 sq mi)
- Elevation: 23 m (75 ft)

Population (2017-12-31)
  - Total: 369
  - Density: 26.4/km^{2} (68.4/sq mi)
- Time zone: UTC+01:00 (CET)
  - Summer (DST): UTC+02:00 (CEST)
- Postal codes: 23923
- Dialling codes: 038828
- Vehicle registration: NWM

Lockwisch (German pronunciation: [ˈlɔkvɪʃ]) is a village and a former municipality in the Nordwestmecklenburg district, in Mecklenburg-Vorpommern, Germany. Since January 2019, it is part of the municipality Schönberg.
