= 337th Separate Helicopter Regiment =

The 337th Independent Helicopter Regiment (Russian: 337-й отдельный вертолётный полк (337 овп; 337 OVP)) is a unit of the Russian Aerospace Forces. It is based at Tolmachevo Airport, near Novosibirsk. It is part of the 14th Air and Air Defence Forces Army, which is controlled by the Central Military District.

It was activated, as part of the Soviet Ground Forces on 15 December 1978 at Sokol District, Saratov Oblast (part of the Moscow Military District). From the following year its home base was at Mahlwinkel, East Germany, as part of the 16th Air Army. The regiment was transferred to the 20th Guards Combined Arms Army when helicopter units shifted from air force to army control in 1986. According to 19 November 1990 data released under the Treaty on Conventional Armed Forces in Europe, the regiment included 49 Mil Mi-24 attack helicopters and eight Mil Mi-8 transport helicopters.

The regiment has been equipped with the Mil Mi-24 and Mil Mi-8 throughout its existence.

1st Squadron, 337th Independent Helicopter Regiment saw action in the Soviet-Afghan War, as did some crews from the 2nd Squadron. In the late 1980s, these elements of the regiment returned to their home base in Germany. Its members during this period included Anatoly Lebed, who was later made a Hero of the Russian Federation.

In 1994, following the dissolution of the Soviet Union, the regiment returned to Russia as part of the Russian Armed Forces, and was then based at Berdsk. For a time, after 2009, it was known as the 3917th Air Base. In 2011, it moved to Tolmachevo, where it was known briefly as the 562nd Army Aviation Base (562 abAA), before returning to its original name.

== Bibliography ==
- Holm (2016). "337th independent Helicopter Regiment". Soviet Armed Forces Order of Battle and Organisation.
- Lensky, A.G.; Tsybin, M.M. (2001). Советские сухопутные войска в последний год Союза ССР [The Soviet Ground Forces in the Last Years of the USSR] (in Russian). St Petersburg: B&K Publishers. ISBN 5-93414-063-9.
- Scramble Magazine, 2018 (no title; article published 28 December.)
