= Krampnitz =

Barracks in Germany

Krampnitz Barracks
- Krampnitz Kaserne
- Potsdam in Germany
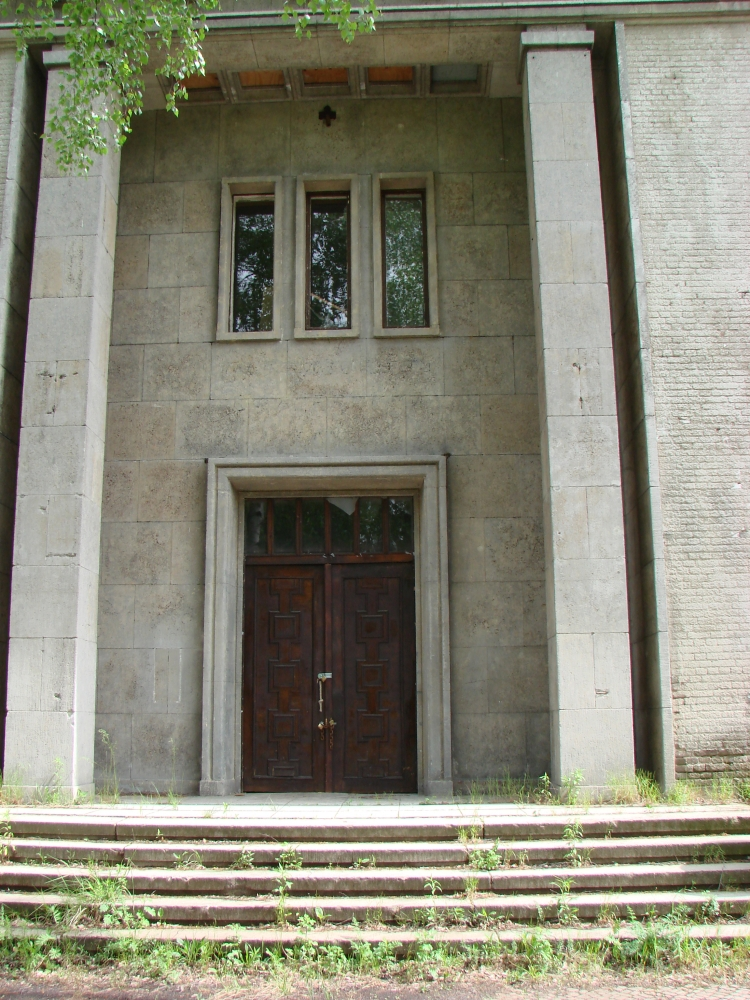
- Entrance into the officers' mess

Site information
- Type: Barracks
- Controlled by: (Nazi Germany) Wehrmacht (1937–1945) (Soviet Union) Soviet Army (1945–1992)
- Condition: Ruin

Location
- Coordinates: 52.4602°N 13.0441°E
- Area: 1,215 km^{2} (469 sq mi)

Site history
- Built: 1937
- In use: 1937-1992
- Materials: Concrete
- Fate: Abandoned

Garrison information
- Garrison: 35th Guards Motor Rifle Division; 10th Guards Uralsko-Lvovskaya Tank Division
- Occupants: 3000-5000 est.

Krampnitz Kaserne was a military complex, in Fahrland, Potsdam, created by the Germans during the rearmament period. It was used by the Germans until the end of the Second World War. After the war it was used by Soviet troops until its abandonment in 1992.

== History ==
The site was used by the German army since 1937 when the cavalry school moved from Hannover, under the name Heeres Reit- und Fahrschule und Kavallerieschule Krampnitz (English: Army Riding and Driving School and Cavalry School). It was under German control until the Red Army took control of the area the day after the Germans abandoned it on April 26, 1945. The 35th Guards Motor Rifle Division of GSFG was then stationed there until its abandonment in 1992, after the Dissolution of the Soviet Union. In July 2013, the city of Potsdam officially decided to make it an urban development area, construction has however been delayed, due a large number of bats taking up residence. The development project is headed by Deutsche Wohnen.

== Layout ==
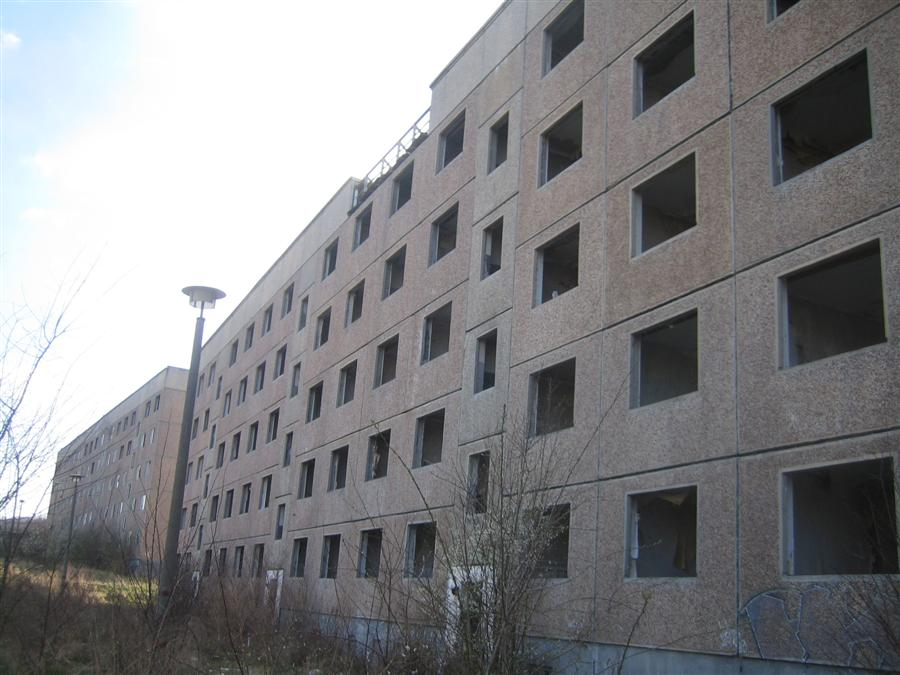
Abandoned apartment buildings

The whole complex consists of more than 50 buildings, most of which are apartment buildings and storage, though it also includes an officers' club, a tennis court, theatre and more. Movies such as Enemy at the Gates, Inglourious Basterds, The Monuments Men, and Valkyrie shot some scenes here.
