= Mahlwinkel =

- Ortsteil of Angern
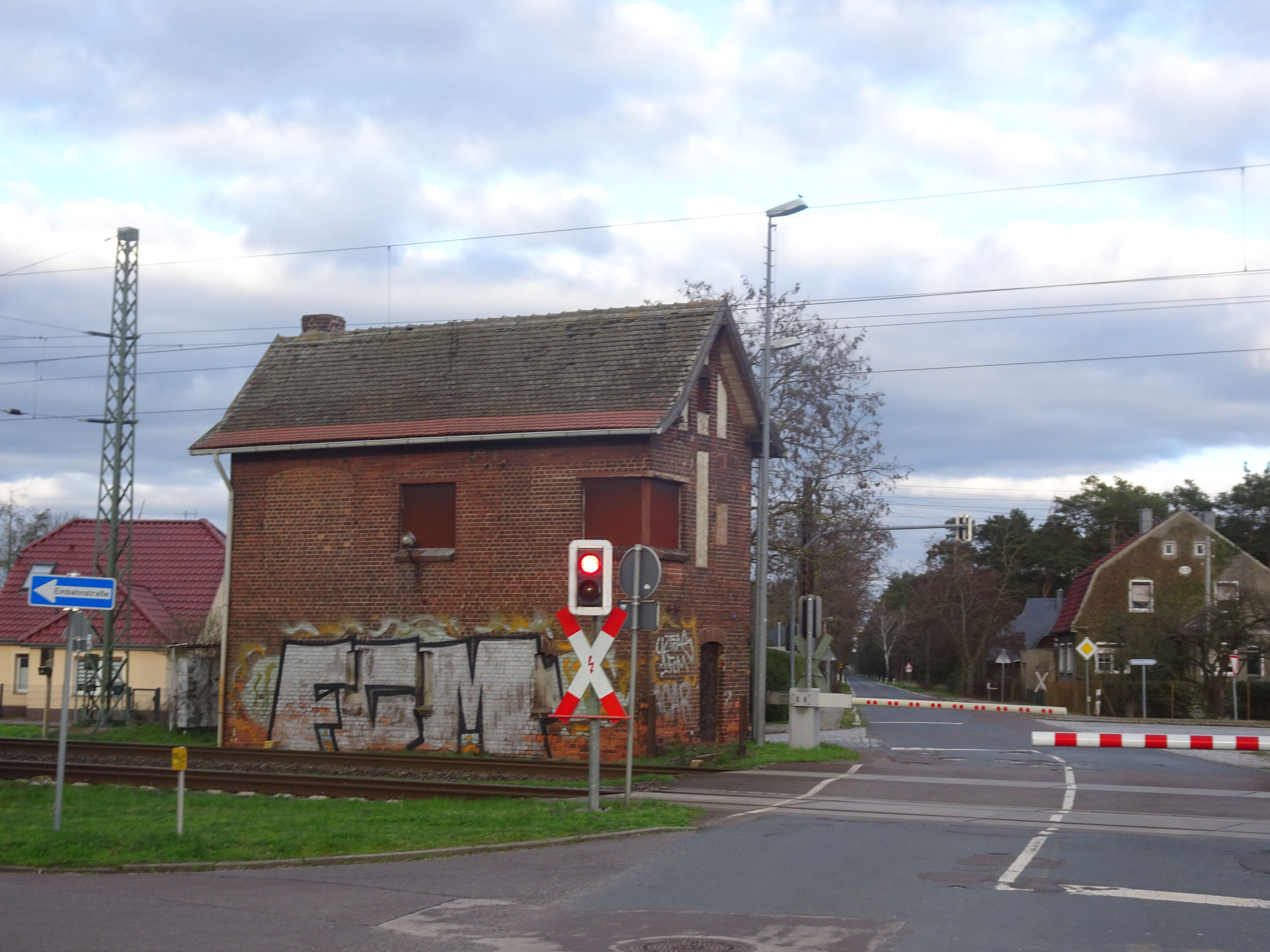

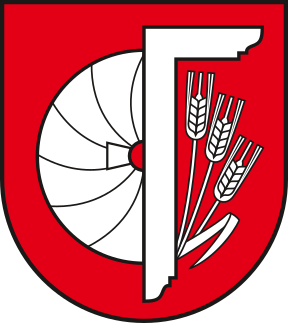
- Coat of arms
- Interactive map of Mahlwinkel
- Location within Germany Location within Saxony-Anhalt
- Coordinates: 52°23′24″N 11°46′59″E
- Country: Germany
- State: Saxony-Anhalt
- District: Börde
- Municipality: Angern

Area
  - Total: 20.73 km^{2} (8.00 sq mi)
- Elevation: 38 m (125 ft)

Population (2006-12-31)
  - Total: 613
  - Density: 29.6/km^{2} (76.6/sq mi)
- Time zone: UTC+01:00 (CET)
  - Summer (DST): UTC+02:00 (CEST)
- Postal codes: 39517
- Dialling codes: 03935
- Vehicle registration: BK
- Website: www.mahlwinkel.de at the Wayback Machine (archived 2014-12-22)

Mahlwinkel is a village and a former municipality in the Börde district in Saxony-Anhalt, Germany. Since 1 January 2010, it is part of the municipality Angern.

== Paintball ==
Mahlwinkel is the home of the biggame series, one of Europe's biggest paintball tournaments. The former Russian army base is used as a huge playfield. About 2,000 players from all over the world visit Mahlwinkel twice a year.
