= Am Mellensee =

- Municipality
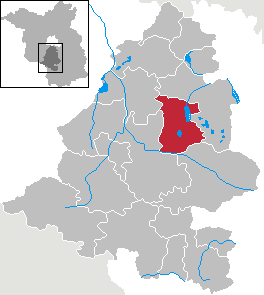
- Location of Am Mellensee within Teltow-Fläming district
- Interactive map of Am Mellensee
- Location within Germany Location within Brandenburg
- Coordinates: 52°08′59″N 13°22′00″E
- Country: Germany
- State: Brandenburg
- District: Teltow-Fläming
- Subdivisions: 8 Ortsteile

Government
  - Mayor (2023–31): Tobias Krüger

Area
  - Total: 104.68 km^{2} (40.42 sq mi)
- Elevation: 43 m (141 ft)

Population (2025-12-31)
  - Total: 7,269
  - Density: 69.44/km^{2} (179.8/sq mi)
- Time zone: UTC+01:00 (CET)
  - Summer (DST): UTC+02:00 (CEST)
- Postal codes: 15838
- Dialling codes: 033703
- Vehicle registration: TF
- Website: www.gemeinde-am-mellensee.de

Am Mellensee (German pronunciation: [am ˈmɛlənzeː], lit. 'On the Mellen Lake') is a municipality in the Teltow-Fläming district of Brandenburg, Germany. The municipality, south of Berlin, is the home of the Benedictine Abbey of St. Gertrud. An Associated Press story appearing in the August 1, 2011 online version of the St. Louis Post-Dispatch detailed the breadmaking there. The nuns make Communion wafers for Eastern Germany's Catholics, including those in the Berlin area, and some Lutheran communities. They will provide the bread for the Communion wafers during the Eucharist for Papal Masses at Erfurt's Cathedral and in Berlin's Olympic Stadium to be celebrated by Pope Benedict XVI for his September 2011 visit to Germany, his third visit as Pope.

== Demography ==
Development of Population since 1875 within the Current Boundaries (Blue Line: Population; Dotted Line: Comparison to Population Development of Brandenburg state; Grey Background: Time of Nazi rule; Red Background: Time of Communist rule)

Recent Population Development and Projections (Population Development before Census 2011 (blue line); Recent Population Development according to the Census in Germany in 2011 (blue bordered line); Projections by the Brandenburg state for 2005-2030 (yellow line); for 2017-2030 (scarlet line); for 2020-2030 (green line) and

Am Mellensee: Population development
within the current boundaries (2020)

Year	Pop.	±% p.a.
1875	3,716	—
1890	4,845	+1.78%
1910	6,328	+1.34%
1925	6,158	−0.18%
1939	9,954	+3.49%
1950	10,424	+0.42%
1964	9,420	−0.72%

Year	Pop.	±% p.a.
1971	9,138	−0.43%
1981	8,320	−0.93%
1985	8,153	−0.51%
1990	7,645	−1.28%
1995	7,296	−0.93%
2000	7,083	−0.59%
2005	6,695	−1.12%

Year	Pop.	±% p.a.
2010	6,479	−0.65%
2015	6,628	+0.46%
2016	6,685	+0.86%
2017	6,747	+0.93%
2018	6,797	+0.74%
2019	6,818	+0.31%
2020	6,946	+1.88%
