= General der Nachrichtenaufklärung Training Referat =

General der Nachrichtenaufklärung Training Referat (Nachrichten Dolmetscher Ersatz und Ausbildings Abteiling) was the training organization within the General der Nachrichtenaufklärung (GDNA), the military signals intelligence agency of the Wehrmacht during World War II. Initially established from May 1941, it continued teaching until September 1944. Until 1942, the work of the Training Referat was not fully exploited and only a small beginners course was taught.

== Training operations ==
During World War II, the Oberkommando der Wehrmacht suffered from an acute shortage of cryptanalyst personnel, and it was found that the practice of pushing forward groups of cryptanalysts to key areas behind the front, did not of itself provide adequate signals intelligence, particularly as the front lines were getting further away from Berlin.

As a result, Commanders of forward intercept units were allowed to create their own cryptanalysts teams. Two difficulties were encountered in this connection; firstly, a lack of technical knowledge, and secondly the entry into the cryptographic service of personal who were untrustworthy from the security point of view. In two cases in KONA 2 in Smolensk personnel were unearthed who were guilty of espionage. As a result of this a security vetting for all security, translators and cryptanalysis personnel was introduced.

Once the forward cryptanalysis units had been set up, and eventually became the Long Range Intelligence Company (NAZ), they were attached to various Close Range Intelligence Company (NAK) which coordinated intelligence and forwarded the raw flow of intercepts into the Signal Intelligence Evaluation Centre (NAAS). It was agreed to allot the NAZ units investigation of forward lines of communication traffic which could be solved in the field. In 7/VI remained, however, responsible for all army cryptanalysis work and concentrated on the most difficult and unsolved procedures.

As a personnel establishment for these forward cryptanalysis units, it was found necessary to have two or three linguists and one to three mathematicians. Such personnel were trained at a six weeks' course by In 7/VI. 200 cryptanalysts were trained successfully and included such individuals as Major Dr Hentze, Lieutenant (German: Oberleutnant) Lüders and Lieutenant Schubert. The results of this work in 1941 and 1942 was to enable In 7/VI to concentrate on research into more difficult procedures.

== Training classification ==
=== Training of signal recruits ===
The Signal Intelligence Replacement and Training Battalion (German: Nachrichten Aufklärung Ersatz und Ausbildungsabteilung) was located in Frankfurt, was responsible for the training of German Army Signal recruits. It had control over Signal Intelligence Replacement and Training Companies in each Service Command District (German: Wehrkreis) where basic training and some training in signal matters were given to the recruits. In time of peace, basic training lasted one year, signal training being taken up after the first three months. During the war, the time of basic training was shortened in order to place more troops more quickly in the field. Recruits were trained in direction-finding, teletype operation, and simple field codes, and they were sent out into field units. No special courses were conducted in the Replacement and Training Companies.

=== Training of signal technicians ===
Most of the signal technicians were trained in specialist academies of various sorts. Academies for carrier frequency, switchboard operators, repair men, etc., were established by the Army and Division and Corps Signal Battalions and at Army Signal Depots. Instructors were mainly non-commissioned officers who had experience in the field.

=== Training of specialists ===
The Signal Interpreter Replacement and Training Battalion (German: Nachrichten Dolmetscher Ersatz und Ausbildungs Abteilung) was relocated in Saint-Avold in March 1944 and relocating back to a garrison in Halle in 1944. This battalion was responsible for the training of signals interpreters who were to be employed in signal intercept units for radio and wireless monitoring. The battalion was divided into three companies: company one was for Romance languages, company two for Slavic languages, and company three for training of Germanic languages. For matters of administration, the battalion was divided into the following 5 platoons:

1. Cadre platoon (German: Stammzug) comprising cadre personnel and instructors in military and intelligence technical matters.
2. Instructor platoon (German: Lehrzug) comprising teachers and members of the instructor group.
3. Training platoon (German: Ausbildungszug)comprising the students who were under instructions in some language.
4. Alert platoon (German: Marschzug) comprising men who have passed their final examination and who are expecting to be sent into action.
5. Pool (German: Auffangkorporalschart) comprising newcomers waiting for their entrance examination.

A rough estimate of the personnel shows that in 1944, there were about 350 to 400 men attending the various languages classes. After the courses which lasted 6 weeks, the men were given a final examination. According to the results of this examination, they were assigned to one of the three following categories:

Courses by categories
Personnel categories	Comment
S – Speakers (German: Sprachmittler)	These were people who spoke well and were able to make themselves understood, but who did not master the language in speaking and writing correctly.
U – Translators (German: Uebersetzer)	These were people who mastered the foreign language in writing, but were only fair in speaking.
D – Interpreters (German: dolmetscher)	These were people who spoke and wrote the foreign language correctly and fluently and whose general education was up to a corresponding standard.

Employment was assigned according to the category to which each person was assigned.

For persons of category S, a special course in monitoring Allied radio communication was organised at Leipzig for English speaking personnel only. The course consisted of three weeks daily instruction in the following subjects:

1. USA and British organisation of signal units.
2. USA and British radio sets used at all levels.
3. USA and British radio call signs.
4. USA and British authorized abbreviations.
5. USA and British message forms.
6. USA and British fixed station and net operational methods.
7. USA and British Army terminology.

Each of the subjects was taught for one hour a day and had a brief examination. In most cases, the lectures were conducted in English to facilitate practice in this language.

=== Training of signals officers ===
The Army Signal Academy located in Halle (German: Heeres Nachrichten Schule) conducted the course for officer candidates of the Signal Corps. Emphasis here was in the first months evenly divided between technical and military subjects. The officer candidates were selected by their commanders in the field after having proved themselves in combat or in outstanding work in their specialty. All enlisted men were eligible, although the racial origin evidently played some part in the selection. One prisoner, for instance, states that he was not allowed to become an officer candidate, because of his Jewish grandmother.

After their selection, the men were given a four weeks course in tactics, Army regulations, customs, technical subjects. Those who passed this preliminary course were sent to the Armed Forces Signal Troop Academy (German: Führungs Nachrichtentruppen Schule) where they were trained for three months in Signal Corps work. From there they were sent into the field for a probation period as leaders of platoons. During this period of training, Colonel Grube states, many of the candidates lost their lives. A final three months at the Signal Academy in Halle brought, with graduation, the rank of Leutnant (second lieutenant).

=== Training of cryptanalysts ===
Nothing is known of the training of Army cryptanalysts before 1939. Major Mettig, the commander in charge of cryptanalysis unit, stated while in interrogation after the war, that when the KONA regiments moved into the field in 1939, no cryptanalysts were available to decipher enemy codes and ciphers. Colonel Kunibert Randewig, the commander at that time of all traffic intercept, or listening stations in the west, however, was able to procure a number of cryptanalysts from the Feste around Berlin, and to this force he added a few mathematicians and linguists. As a result, when the German offensive began in April 1940, the KONA units had a moderate supply of cryptographic personnel. The early war years clearly showed that additional personnel were needed. A Training Section in In 7/Vi was established under the leadership of Kuehn, but Mettig stated that the work in the unit was not fully exploited until 1942. The Training Section was located at Matthäikirchplatz 4 in Berlin until November 1943, when it was moved with the rest of the Agency to Jüterbog because of the Allied bombings. In November 1944, the Training Section 7 of In 7/VI became Referat 5 of Group IV of the GDNA. The training academy consisted of about 20 officers with 120 men, and about 12 women who worked as stenographers.

The course, which lasted 10–12 weeks ran during the morning and for two to three afternoons per week. Instruction was verbal and by blackboard. A brief history of cryptography was studied from a syllabus, and included a general picture of the methods of encipherment, details of various means of encipherment and decipherment. During the remaining afternoons, the students evidently specialized in whatever field to which they were to be assigned. One prisoner of war, Gerd Coeler, stated that during the afternoons, he studied English military terms and abbreviations, including the history and organisation of the British Empire and the geography of England. Corporal Karrenberg outlines the course given for those who were specializing in Russian cryptanalysis. Participants were selected from the personnel of the Signal Interpreter Replacement and Training Battalion, that understood the Russian language. After the most capable interpreters had been selected they were given a course in Russian cryptography, which included all types of Russian systems. For practice in this course actual Soviet military intercepts were used, to gradually accustom the men to Soviet field problems.

=== The German Army Cryptography Course ===
The course consisted of the following:

==== Substitutions methods ====
A simple substitution, or more accurately a mono-alphabetic substitution ciphers is a generalisation of the Caesar cipher where there can be any permutation of the alphabet. For the simple substitution cipher there are 26! possible keys, which is huge, but even then, the cipher insecure.

After methods of solution were demonstrated on the blackboard, each student was given practice problems, based on clear English text, to solve for themself. The SKYO machine, syllabic codes and code books were also dealt with at this stage. Of these, the British War Office Code was treated in greater detail and based on this, students were explained the general methods of breaking the recipher and the methods to reconstructing a code book.

===== A =====
A clear symbol, e.g. letter, figure, syllable, word, is replaced by a cipher symbol

- Simple substitution with standard alphabet

- a) Alphabetic simple polyalphabetic cipher

Simple Alphabetic
Method?	Result
Clear alphabet	ABCDE......
Cipher alphabet	DEFGH......

Example of enciphering;-

Results
Method?	Result
Clear	BAD DAY..
Cipher	EDC CD...

- b) Simple substitution cipher with standard alphabet

Standard Alphabet
Method?	Result
Clear alphabet	ABCDE......
Cipher alphabet	ZYXWV

Method for enciphering as for (a).

- c) Normal simple substitution cipher with mixed alphabet

Mixed Alphabet
Method?	Result
Clear alphabet	ABCDE......
Cipher alphabet	GAZXI.....

Method for enciphering as for (a).

- Polyalphabetic cipher variants

This can take several variants. When enciphering a clear letter by means of a cipher symbol it is only possible to do this with variants by taking the ten figure symbols in addition to the alphabet letters. In such cases the ten figures are either allotted as variants to the ten high frequency letters of the alphabet, or alternatively three variants are allotted to a few frequent letters and the remainder to the next frequently occurring ones. It follows then that the frequencies are altered and that peaks in frequency graphs cannot be found easily.

Polyalphabetic cipher
Method	Message																			
Clear	A	B	C	D	E	F	G	H	I	J	K	L	M	N	O	P	Q	R	S	T
Cipher	C		T		1			B	Z		A	9		7	M	D			G	X
	Y				L				5					C	N	F			H	3
					O															8

Example of enciphering:

Results
Method?	Result
Clear	ATTACK
Cipher	CX3YTA

Figures for enciphered by using clear words, e.g.7=seven, and so on. The other forms of polyalphabetic cipher with variants were described next.

- Polyalphabetic cipher with regular patterns

The number of alphabets in polyalphabetic ciphers of regular pattern varies between 3 and 40. The following is an example of a polyalphabetic cipher of 3 alphabets of regular pattern that would have been studied on the course.

Polyalphabetic cipher with regular patterns
Column 1		Column 2		Column 3		Column 4	
Clear	Cipher	Clear	Cipher	Clear	Cipher	Clear	Cipher
A	X	A	I	A	F	A	X
B	G	B	L	B	A	B	G
C	A	C	K	C	S	C	H
D	H	D	B	D	Z	D	A
.	..	.	.	.	.	.	.

Example of an enciphering:

Enciphered Results
Method?	Result
Clear alphabet	BAD DAY......
Cipher alphabet	GIZ HI.....

An example of a later British SKYO device. On this device, the alphabets of letters and numbers are printed vertically, with 32 sliding strips.

Alphabetical polyalphabetic ciphers of regular pattern are possible but are not generally used. However, polyalphabetic ciphers with variants occurred more frequently and were what the German cryptanalyst would expect. The British SYKO Strip Cipher is built on the principle of 32 alphabets polyalphabetic cipher of regular pattern, except for the difference that the messages can start anywhere within the first 10 columns, that is given by the indicator group. Each line can also start anywhere within the first 10 columns.

- Polyalphabetic cipher-hatted

This is similar to a polyalphabetic cipher of regular pattern, except that the sequence of alphabets is hatted, meaning random, e.g.:

Column 1	Column 2	Column 3	Column 4	Column 5=2	Column 6=1

Possible variants can be worked out to solution and evaluated as the previous example, at Polyalphabetic cipher with regular patterns.

===== B =====
A Clear Symbol replaced by two cipher symbols.

- Polyalphabetic cipher with variants (?)

In this instance, the clear symbol is replaced by 2 letters of 2 figures so that if, e.g. figures (cipher) are taken, 100 cipher symbols are available, i.e. clear letters can be given from 3 to 5 variants. The following example describes his variant:

Polyalphabetic cipher with variants
Method	Message				
Clear	A	B	C	D	E
Cipher	03	09	13	..	..
	74	11	24	..	..
	82	17	35	..	
	91		48		
	97				

The training referat new that almost all British cipher originated from the polyalphabetic cipher with variants in which, however, one clear symbol is replaced by 2 or more letters. In the case of this kind, or type of system known around 1941 to 1942, a card of 26 x 26 was used, containing cleat syllables or words, constituting 676 combinations. In additions card also contained letters, for spelling and figures. All clear symbols were indicated, i.e. expressed in a coordinate system, by means of two letters taken from two hatted alphabets. The Slidex and the Tauschtafel system from the Kenngruppenbuch are also based on this system.

- The two letter and/or two figure syllable code

Generally arranged in the form of a book, it can be alphabetical as well as non-alphabetical. In addition to cleat syllables, clear letters and figures can also be replaced by code symbols so that all clear words or text can be encoded. Two-letter codes are generally favoured, as a greater number of code bigrams (676) is available in such cases.

- The two letter and/or two figure WORD code

As for above, except that instead of clear syllable, clear words were encoded by means of letters or figures. From the middle of 1944, the GDNA identified the use of a word code, that was used in the area of the 2nd Ukrainian Front.

===== C =====
A clear symbol is replaced by three cipher symbols.

This method was mostly used only in the form of three-figure or 3-F codes, similar to B.3 above. 3-F codes were cryptanalysed by the German cipher agencies, General der Nachrichtenaufklärung (GDNA), OKW/Chi and the Luftnachrichten Abteilung 350.

===== D =====
A clear symbol is replaced by four cipher symbols.

This type of code appears in the form of four-figure of 4-F codes. similar to B.3 above. Solving of these types of ciphers are more difficult by use of recipher, such as for instance the subtracters or adders. In the case of the British War Office Code, it took the form of a practically unending, un-periodical figure recipher. This type of code was also faced by the agencies described above.

===== E =====
A clear symbol is replaced by five cipher symbols.

The only practical example quoted was the Russian 5-F code, and this was only solved sporadically, e.g. 5 Digit codes.

==== Transposition methods ====
Transposition ciphers jumble the letters or figures of the message in a way that it designed to confuse the attacker. The main characteristic that was found by the German Army cipher bureaux was that the Transposition cipher statistics always produced normal Plaintext frequency data

===== A =====
Hive transposition.

This is used only for short texts, and lacks security. For example:

Hive transposition
Method	Message							
Example	2	5	1	7	8	4	6	3
Clear	F	A	B	E	R	M	A	X
Cipher	B	F	X	M	A	A	E	R

===== B =====
The transposition patterns, e.g. squares, rectangles and so on.

- The simple transposition pattern.

- The complete pattern

This was the easiest form of this type of cipher. The width of the pattern varies. The most common ones vary from 7 to approximately 25. The text is written out from left to right and read out, in columns (Columnar transposition from top to bottom, according to a figure key or a key word written above the pattern.

Simple transposition
Method	Message						
EXAMPLE	3	1	4	6	7	5	1
Clear	R	E	F	Y	O	U	R
Clear	M	E	E	S	A	G	E
Clear	F	R	O	M	J	A	N

The returned Cipher: EERRE NRMFF SOUGA YSMOA J

- The incomplete pattern

Similar to the example above, except the last line in the rectangle or square is not complete and that therefore the depth of the figure in certain columns differs by 1. This can render breaking considerably more difficult.

- The Serpentine transposition cipher

In the serpentine or Route transposition cipher, the plaintext is written down as the cipher above. The only difference lies in the method of reading enciphered text out. In a route cipher, the plaintext is first written out in a grid of given dimensions, then read off in a pattern given in the key. The key might specify "spiral inwards, clockwise, starting from the top right". Another example could be:

Column marked 1 is read out from top to bottom
Column marked 2 is read out from top to bottom
Column marked 3 is read out from bottom to top and so on.

- The Combo cube or transposition patten with incomplete rectangle.

Consider the following example:

Combo cube
Method	Message						
Clear	2	3	4	6	7	5	1
Clear	R			E			F
Clear	Y		O	U	R		M

The returned cipher: FMFRY EROSM SOEEU ARG

- The Diagonal Transposition cipher

The plaintext is written down as for 1a above. Reading out is done with or without a key, diagonally as agreed beforehand between the addressor and addressee. Many variations were found by the GDNA to be used on the Eastern Front, included in the form of the route or serpentine pattern. The following is one method of reading out a message:

The returned cipher:FSRPS OEUAM RNRGE CMEFE EEYR

- The Double Transposition cipher

During World War II, the Transposition cipher#Double transposition was used by Dutch Resistance groups, the French Maquis and the British Special Operations Executive (SOE), which was in charge of managing resistance activities in Europe. It was also used by agents of the American Office of Strategic Services and as an emergency cipher for the German Army and Navy.

Double transposition
Method	Message						
Clear	3	1	4	6	7	5	2
Clear	R	E	F	Y	O	U	R
Clear	M	E	E	S	A	G	E
Clear	F	R	O	M	J	A	N

Double transposition reciphered
Method	Message						
Reciphered	3	1	4	6	7	5	2
Reciphered	E	E	R	R	E	N	R
Reciphered	M	F	F	S	O	U	G
Reciphered	A	Y	S	M	O	A	J

The returned cipher: EFYRG JEMAR FSNUA RSMEO O... The second pattern, as a rectangle can of course, have any other shape width or key.

- The RASTER cipher

The RASTER was a form of the Grille cipher and was used extensively by the Germany Army, and by the Allies, e.g. during the spring and summer of 1941, the radio traffic of the Hungarian State Railways was monitored from a GDNA Feste unit in Turin. The code being used at that time by the railways was a (Turning grill) with permanent squares which could be turned in four different positions, and reversed to give four additional positions.

- The simple RASTER

The principle is the same as the transposition pattern with incomplete rectangle (B.4) when hatted or hive transposition takes place according to a key. When no hatting or hive transposition takes place, the blank spaces in the pattern are filled in, with clear letters, the result that the clear text appears in a practically regular sequence, but with numerous breaks.

- The revolving RASTER

This is particularly complicated form of cipher from the transposition cipher with incomplete rectangle described above, and developed from the simple hatted raster described above. Entering or writing in of clear text is not done continually, from left to right, but the use of the denting, i.e. changing pattern, of the stencil is changed four times, i.e. changing the stencil position by revolving it periodically through 90°.

==== Combined methods ====
Combining of various basic cipher systems in order to get a combined cipher, or a cipher with recipher were also studied. Examples included the reciphered Russian 4-figure code described above, a polyalphabetically reciphered transposition cipher and the a letter Tauschtafel system from the Kenngruppenbuch and used in the key setting procedure for the Naval Enigma machine.

==== Machine ciphers ====
This cipher built upon the principle of a practically unending polyalphabetical cipher of a regular pattern and mentioned on the course for academic interest only.

=== Evaluation of signal training ===
The training of cryptanalysts by the Army appeared to have been successful. The classes the men used at the Training Section of In 7/VI passed most of the men who would later become specialists in the field of cryptanalysis either in the KONAs or in the central agencies.

The training of signal troops in the field, appeared to be less successful. Throughout the TICOM documentation, attention is drawn to the acute shortages in the Field Army of personnel who were well trained in signal intelligence operations. This was particularly true in the late years of the war when courses became more disorganised and less effective. The central agencies recognized this weakness and attempted to remedy it by publishing field manuals on security and having lectures given at the Army Signals School in Halle (German: Heeres-Nachrichten-Schule II) by members of In 7/VI. Despite these efforts, however, the Field Army remained, according to Walter Fricke, pitifully ignorant of the principles of security. Ignorance undoubtedly lay at the bottom of the non-cooperative attitude of the Field Army in regard to the adoption of systems considered more secure than those in use by the Army. Conditions were aggravated at the end of the war by the necessity for sending all able-bodied men into the front line and by the general confusion of the Army. Very little training could be carried on by the Field Army during the late months of the war since their schools were taken over by the operational agencies they used to train. For example, the Army Signal School at Halle had been used by the In 7/IV since November 1943 for the preparation of Army keys, and after March 1945 it housed a considerable section of the OKW/Chi, including service personnel and civilians. After 1944, little if any signal training was carried out by the Army.
