= Johannes Marquart =

German actuarial and insurance mathematician in the 19th century

Johannes Anton Marquart (born 27 September 1909 in Erolzheim in Germany) was a German actuarial and insurance mathematician. During World War II, Marquart was employed into the Germany Army Inspectorate 7/VI, in 1940, which later became the General der Nachrichtenaufklärung. He eventually became head of Referat Ia of Group IV of the organization in November 1944 engaged in research into German Army hand cryptographic systems. Prior to that period Marquart had been chief cryptanalysis in KONA 5.

== Life ==
Marquart was educated in the Oberrealschule in Erolzheim. He then attended the University of Tübingen, the Ludwig-Maximilians-Universität München, the University of Vienna and the Goethe University Frankfurt. From Frankfurt University in 1932, he received his degree (German: diplomierter Mathematiker) in mathematics. He was employed as Actuarial Mathematician (German: Versicherungsmathematik) until 1940, when he was employed into the Signal Corps of the Wehrmacht and Waffen SS (German: Nachrichtentruppe des Heeres). In 1940 Marquart was posted to OKH/In 7/VI as an employee (German: Angestellter) and for the first year carried out research on German hand ciphers. From 1940 to 1941, Marquart assisted Hans Pietsch, who was director of the mathematical cryptography department at In 7/VI, on hand ciphers, while working as a civilian.

In 1942, he was drafted to In 7/VI with the rank of Sonderführer, equivalent to the military rank of Major, and was put in charge of a series of courses in elementary cryptanalysis, which work he continued until 1944. He was then promoted to Government technical expert (German: Regierungsbaurat) and was given command over Referat Ia for special research. Marquart's speciality at OKH had been research on the possibility of solution of hand ciphers, and after that with the hand cyphers of foreign countries which were passed to Section Ia from the various (German: Laender) sections of Referat IV.

After the war, Marquart worked in the German insurance firm, Allianz Lebensversicherung in Stuttgart, as a field insurance agent for the territory around Mittelbiberach, that at the time was part of the French zone.

== Cryptanalytic experience ==
As head of special research section for hand ciphers, Marquart's work was of a varied nature. Marquart worked on the following hand ciphers:

=== Josip Broz Tito System ===
This Josip Broz Tito cipher consisted of the alphabet substituted into figures in such a way that the commonest letters were allotted one figure equivalents while the rarer letters were expressed as figure digraphs. The resulting figures were then reciphered (recencrypted) by a periodic additive, the length of which varied from time to time. At first, the period was very short (5,7 or 9); later it rose to 35 or 45 and at the end, Marquart thought that it was used on a one-time basis, since no further successes could be achieved.

=== Draža Mihailović System ===
The Draža Mihailović hand cipher was a Double Transposition cipher, using the same key for both cages, the keys being derived from a novel. Marquarts section achieved a fair measure of success with this system, owing to errors in encipherment, stereotyped signatures and also the fact that the cages were often filled up to rectangles with rare letters. Under such circumstances, it was often possible to recover the key from a single message. In some cases, by working out the basic text from which the keys had been derived, they were able to recognize and obtain the novel and hence to read all message traffic currently. All cryptanalytic work on the double transposition systems was carried out entirely by hand by Marquart, and no attempt was made to develop any statistical machine methods for solution.

=== British Army Double Transposition ===
This code used two different keys, which were taken from a large group. Marquart was unable to guess at the size of the book that had never been captured. His work was looking for errors in encipherment which happened rarely and for messages in depth, which practically never occurred.

=== Russian Blocknots ===
Marquart conducted research in the Soviet Union Blocknot traffic. Blocknots were random sequences of numbers contained in a book and organized by numbered rows and columns and were used as additives in reciphering. Marquart and his unit conducted extensive research in an attempt to discover the method by which they were produced. All the counts which they made, however, failed to reveal any non-random characteristics in the design of the tables, and while they thought the Blocknots must have been generated by machine, they were never able to draw any concrete deductions as a result of their research.

=== Polish Lublin System ===
Lastly, Marquart worked on a system used by the military forces of the Lublin Government just before the end of the war.
