= Blocknots =

Blocknots were random sequences of numbers contained in a book and organized by numbered rows and columns and were used as additives (Note: An additive is either a single digit or numerical group, or series of digits which for the purpose of encipherment, is added to a numerical cipher unit usually by cryptographic arithmetic to encipher a text message. When the message needs to deciphered, the additive is removed first to recover the original enciphered message.) in the reciphering of Soviet Union codes, during World War II. The Blocknot consisted of a booklet of fifty sheets of 5-figure random additive, 100 additive groups to a sheet. No sheet was used more than once, thus the blocknots were in effect a form of one-time pad. The Soviet Unions highest grade ciphers that were used in the East, were the 5-figure codebook enciphered with the Blocknot book, and were generally considered unbreakable.

== Technical Description ==
Blocknots were distributed centrally from an office in Moscow. Every Blocknot contained 5-figure groups in a number of sheets, for the enciphering of 5-figure messages. The encipherment was effected by applying additives taken from the pad, of which 50-100 5-figure groups appeared. Each pad had a 5-figure number and each sheet had a 2-figure number running consecutively. There were 5 different types of Blocknots, in two different categories

- The Individual in which each table of random numbers was used only once.
- The General in which each page of the Blocknot was valid for one day. The security of the additive sequence rested on the choice of different starting points for each message. In 5-figure messages, the blocknot was one of the first 10 Groups in the message. Its position changed at long intervals, but was always easy to re-identify. The Russians differentiated between three types of blocks:
1. The 3-block, DRIERBLOCK. I-block for Individual Block: 50 pages, additive read off in one direction only. The messages could be used and read only between 2 wireless telegraphy stations on one net.
2. The 6-block, SECHSERBLOCK. Z-block for Circular Block: 30 pages, additive read off in either direction. The messages could be used and read, between all W/T stations in a net.
3. The 2-block, ZWEIERBLOCK. OS-block. Used only in traffic from lower to higher formations.

Two other types were used, in lower echelons.

1. Notblock: Used in an emergency.
2. Blocknot used for passing on traffic.

The distribution of Blocknots was carried out centrally from Moscow to Army Groups then to Armies. The Army was responsible for their distribution throughout the lower levels of the army down to company level. Independent units took their cipher material with them. Occasionally the same blocknot was distributed to two units on different parts of the front, which enabled Depth to be established. Records of all Blocknots used were kept in Berlin and when a repeat was noticed a BLOCKNOT ANGEBOT message was sent out to all German Signals units, to indicate that it may have been possible to break the code using it. There was no certainty in this.

A cryptanalyst with the General der Nachrichtenaufklärung stated while being interrogated by TICOM:

It seems that depths of up to 8 were established at the beginning of the Russian Campaign but that no 5-figure code was broken after May 1943

German cryptanalysts who were prisoners of war stated under interrogation, that each of the figures 0 to 9 were placed en clair usually within the first ten groups of the text or sometimes at the end. One indicator was the Blocknot number and the consisted of two random figures, the figure representing the type, and the remaining two, the page of the Blocknot being used.

In long messages, 000000 was placed in the message when the end of a page had been reached.

== Chi number ==
The Chi-number was the serial numbering of all 5-figure messages passing through the hands of the Cipher Officer, starting on the first of January and ending on thirty-first December of the current year. It always appeared as the last group in an intercepted message, e.g. 00001 on the 1st January, or when the unit was newly set up. The progression of Chi-numbers was carefully observed and recorded in the form of a graph. A Russian corps had about 10 5-figure messages per day, and Army about 20-30 and a Front about 60–100. After only a relatively short time, the individual curves separated sharply and the type of formation could be recognized by the height of the Chi-number alone.

== Monitoring ==
Blocknots were tracked in a card index, that was maintained by the Signal Intelligence Evaluation Centre (NAAS). The NAAS functionality included evaluation and traffic analysis, cryptanalysis, collation and dissemination of intelligence. The card index, which was one amongst several Card Indexes. A careful recording and study of blocks provided the positive clues in the identification and tracking of formations using 5-figure ciphers. The index was subdivided into two files:

1. Search card index, contained all blocknots and chi-numbers whether or not they were known.
2. Unit card index, contained only known Block and Chi-numbers.

Inspector Berger, who was the chief cryptanalyst of NAAS 1 stated that the two files formed:

The most important and surest instruments for identifying Russian radio nets, known to him.

The Blocknots were also used in the Stationary Intercept Company (Feste), the military unit that was designed to work at a lower level to the NAAS, at the Army level and were semi-motorized, and closer to the front. The Feste used the Blocknot value along with several other parameters to build a network diagram. The network diagram was studied extensively, as part of a 6-stage process, that involved several departments within the Feste. The outcome was a metric which determined the most interesting circuit for traffic monitoring, and least interesting, where monitoring of traffic should cease.

== Analysis ==
Johannes Marquart was a mathematician and cryptanalyst who initially worked for Inspectorate 7/VI and later led Referat Ia of Group IV of the General der Nachrichtenaufklärung. Marquart was assigned the study of the Soviet Union Blocknot traffic. Marquart and his unit conducted extensive research in an attempt to discover the method by which they were produced. All the counts which they made, however, failed to reveal any non-random characteristics in the design of the tables, and while they thought the Blocknots must have been generated by machine, they were never able to draw any concrete deductions as a result of their research.

== Example ==
The Soviet 3rd Guard Tank Army transmits a 5-figure message with the Blocknot of 37581 (one of the first 10 groups in the message). On the same day the Block 37582 was used by the same formation. The next day 37583 appeared. Thereafter, for a period, the Army was not heard by German Wireless telegraphy intercept operators, as it was maintaining wireless silence. After a few days, an unidentified net with the Blocknot 37588 is picked up. This message net is claimed, because of the proximity of the blocks (88/83) to be the 3rd Guard Tank Army. The missing Blocknots 84-87 were presumably used in telegraphic, telephonic or courier communications. The Chi number provides confirmation of the first assumption, based on proximity of blocknots in most cases.
