= Heer and Luftwaffe Signals School =

- Heeres und Luftwaffennachrichtenschule
- Near Halle in Germany
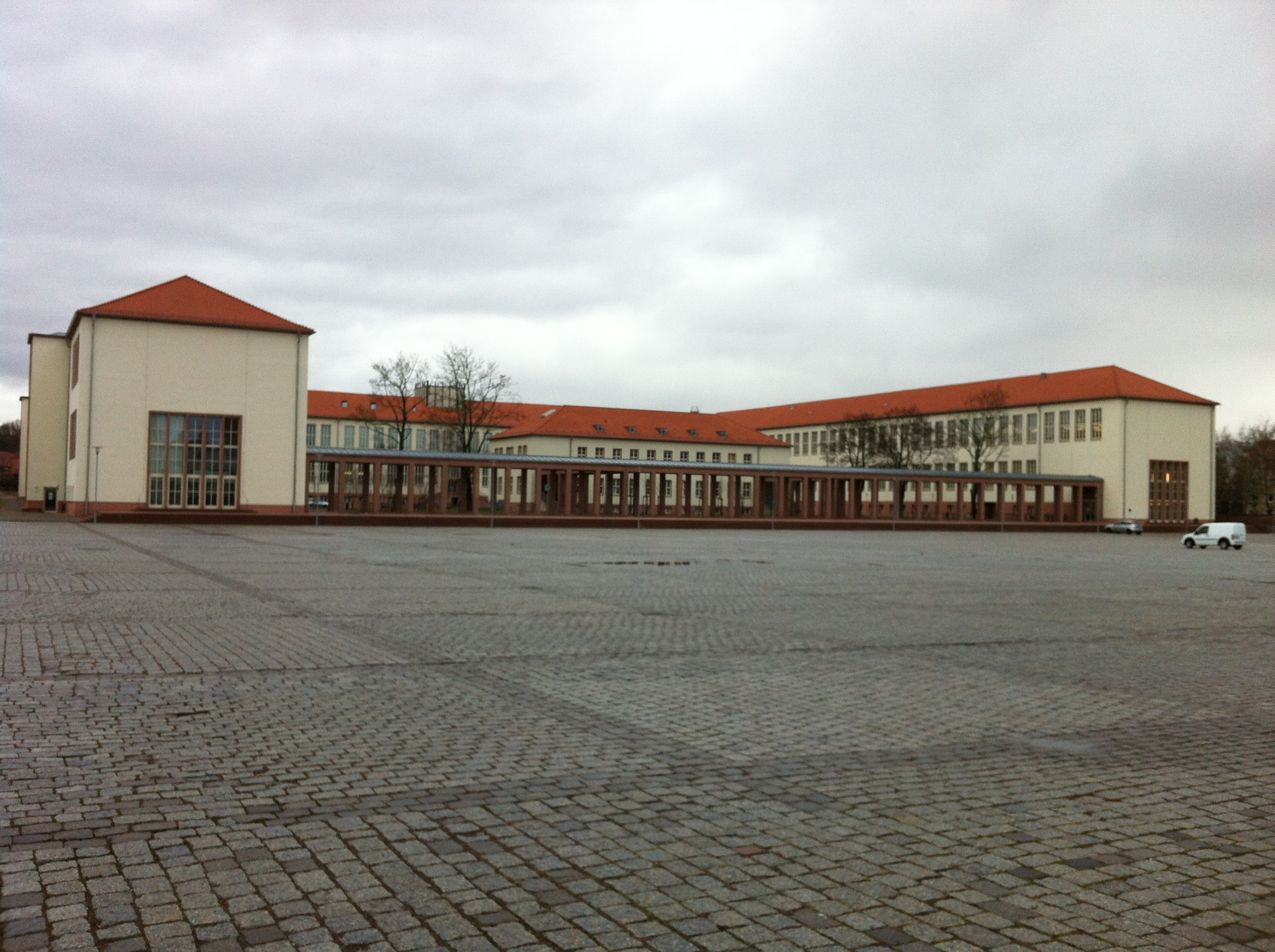
- Northern school building on the former roll call square

Location
- Coordinates: 51°29′51″N 11°56′6″E

Site history
- Built: 1934
- In use: 1937

Garrison information
- Past commanders: Ernst Sachs
- Occupants: Luftwaffe 2. Flak-Division; Army and Air Force Intelligence Academy; Luftwaffe lecturing and testing section; Remains of OKW/Chi January 1945-15 April 1945; 104th Infantry Division; 7th Armored Division April–June 1945; 8th Guards Army July 1945 - July 1991

Heer and Luftwaffe Signals School was the radio intelligence training establishment for the Wehrmacht and Luftwaffe during World War II and belonged to the site of the General Maercker barracks. The training academy was built between 1934 and 1937 to designs by Ernst Sagebiel. The former intelligence academy is located in Halle (Saale) in the Heide-Süd district of Heideallee.

== History ==
As part of the secret German re-armament during the interwar period from 14 October 1934, an intelligence academy was planned to be constructed in Halle (Saale). In the very short construction period up to the use of the first buildings from 1935, material transports were carried out by rail, for which a siding had been moved from the Halle-Hettstedter Eisenbahn-Gesellschaft railway to the academy. A total of 160 buildings with approx. 1.2 million m³ of converted space were built.

The school was to become part of the construction of a modern air force in the course of the war preparations of the German Reich. In order to conceal the activities in Halle, the planning of the buildings was initially carried out under the guise of the construction of a pasta factory.

In 1935, the old Reichswehr cipher training academy, which had been stationed in Jüterbog, moved to the site. In 1936, the Heer and Luftwaffe Signals School separated into two parts, the Wehrmacht and Luftwaffe schools. The site also included the staff and support personnel of the airport, Fliegerhorst Halle-Nietleben, that was then rededicated from civilian to military use, which was under the command of Airport Division 7./III (German: Flughafenbereichskommando 7) in Großenhain, Saxony and subordinated to Air District III (German: Luftgau Command III) in Berlin.

From 1935 to 1937 there was also the air intelligence teaching and testing section at the site, which was then moved to Köthen. Also in the general Maercker Barracks, the Flak Regiment 33 was stationed in the 2nd Flak Division.

The first commander of the school was Generalmajor Ernst Sachs from 1934 to 1936.

In April 1945, Halle was largely undamaged by combat, the 104th Infantry Division of the 9th U.S. Army took over the school and barracks. Parts of the 7th U.S. Tank Division were also stationed.

From about July 1945, the Soviet 8th Guard Army took over the barracks, as an occupying force. Halle was headquarters and site of the 27th Guards Motor Rifle Division. Up to 9,000 soldiers were stationed on the entire site. From the mid-1960s, in the western area was mobile missile technical base, number: 38673 Nuclear warheads for the 2K6 Luna and OTR-21 Tochka warheads were stored and transported to and from the site. For more than 20 years, nuclear weapons were probably stored in Halle. Sometime between 1989 and no later than 1991, the warheads were removed from the soil roofed bunkers, back to the Soviet Union.

After the German reunification, the Soviet troops withdrew from Halle in July 1991, as a result of the Two Plus Four Treaty. In 1994, the city of Halle and the state of Saxony-Anhalt acquired the location from the federal capital, Magdeburg. From 1995, after the refurbishment of the partially polluted site in the area of the barracks, parts of the new residential area were built around Heath-Süd. The listed buildings of the former Intelligence school were also refurbished and are now supported by various departments of the Martin Luther University of Halle-Wittenberg as well as for numerous university and non-university research institutions at the vineyard Campus.

== Structures ==
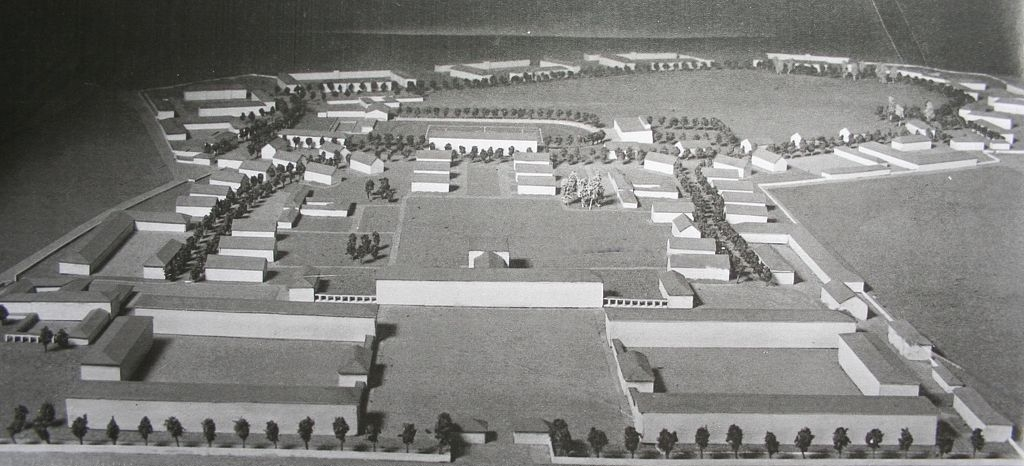
Air and Army Signals School Hall Model circa 1935

The complex originally consisted of around 160 buildings, and this included the buildings of the Heer and Luftwaffe Signals School, the offices, officers mess, magazine buildings, bunkers, armouries and workshops, residential and accommodation buildings of the General Maercker barracks. At the centre of the school is a large roll call square whose entrance is flanked by two pavilion-like guard houses. To the right and left of the roll call square are the school buildings in the form of two large four-storey three-wing systems whose courtyards are delimited by colonnade-like corridors to the roll-call area.

The school was adjoined by the barracks area, which was opened up by an approximately 1.5 kilometre garrison road running in an oval. The buildings are designed as simple plaster buildings with hipped roofs and laid out in a kind of garden city-like ensemble. In contrast to the monumental and archaic architecture of representative buildings of the Nazi regime, a simple objective architecture was used here, as is often the case with buildings for the Luftwaffe.

In the courtyard of the southern school building is the 2002 Geological Garden of Halle.

The building of the flight control and two hangar air base Halle-Nietleben no longer exist today. The sidings of Halle-Nietleben station still existed until the end of the nineties.

== Gallery ==
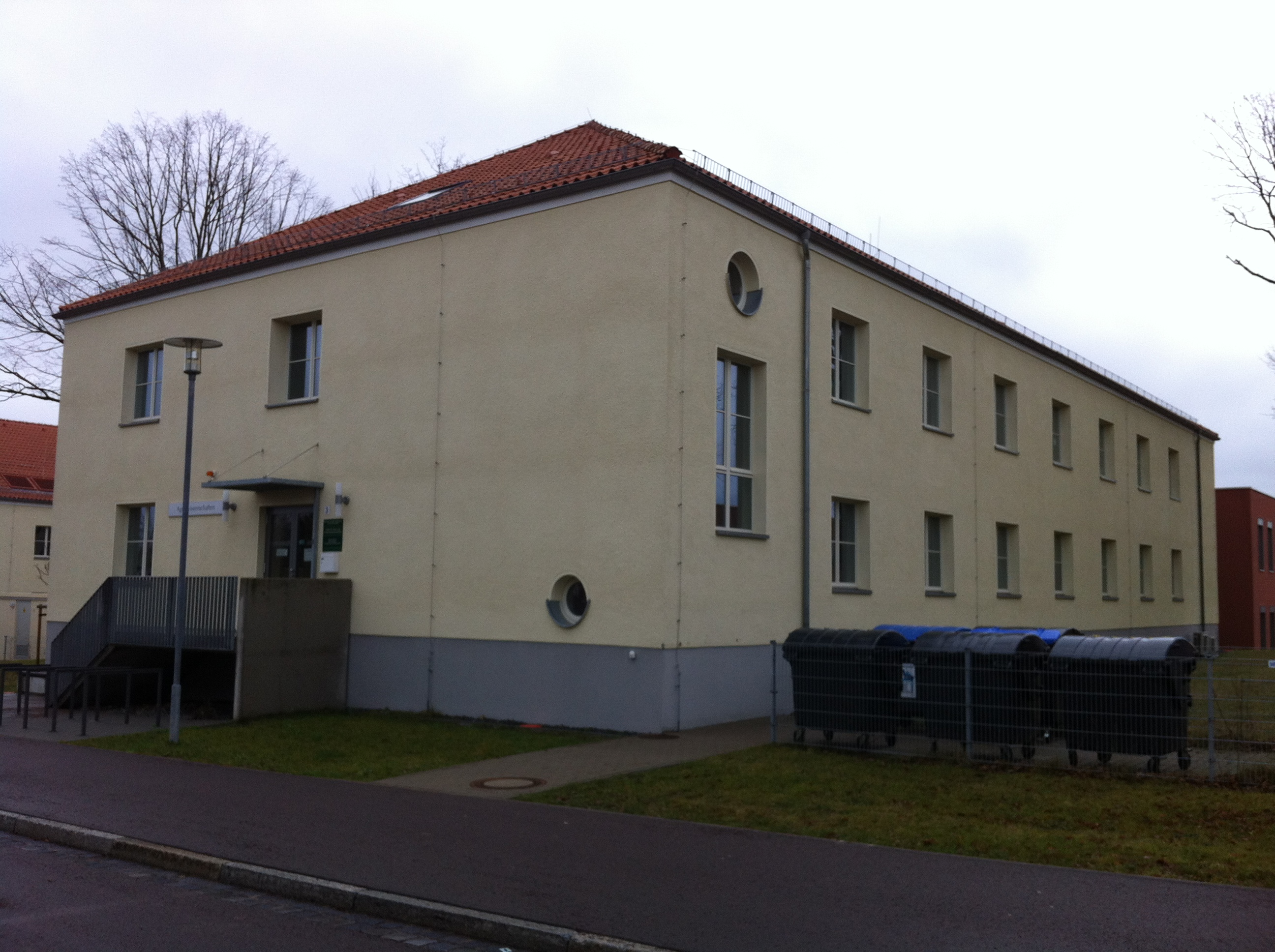
Renovated accommodation building; Current user Martin Luther University.

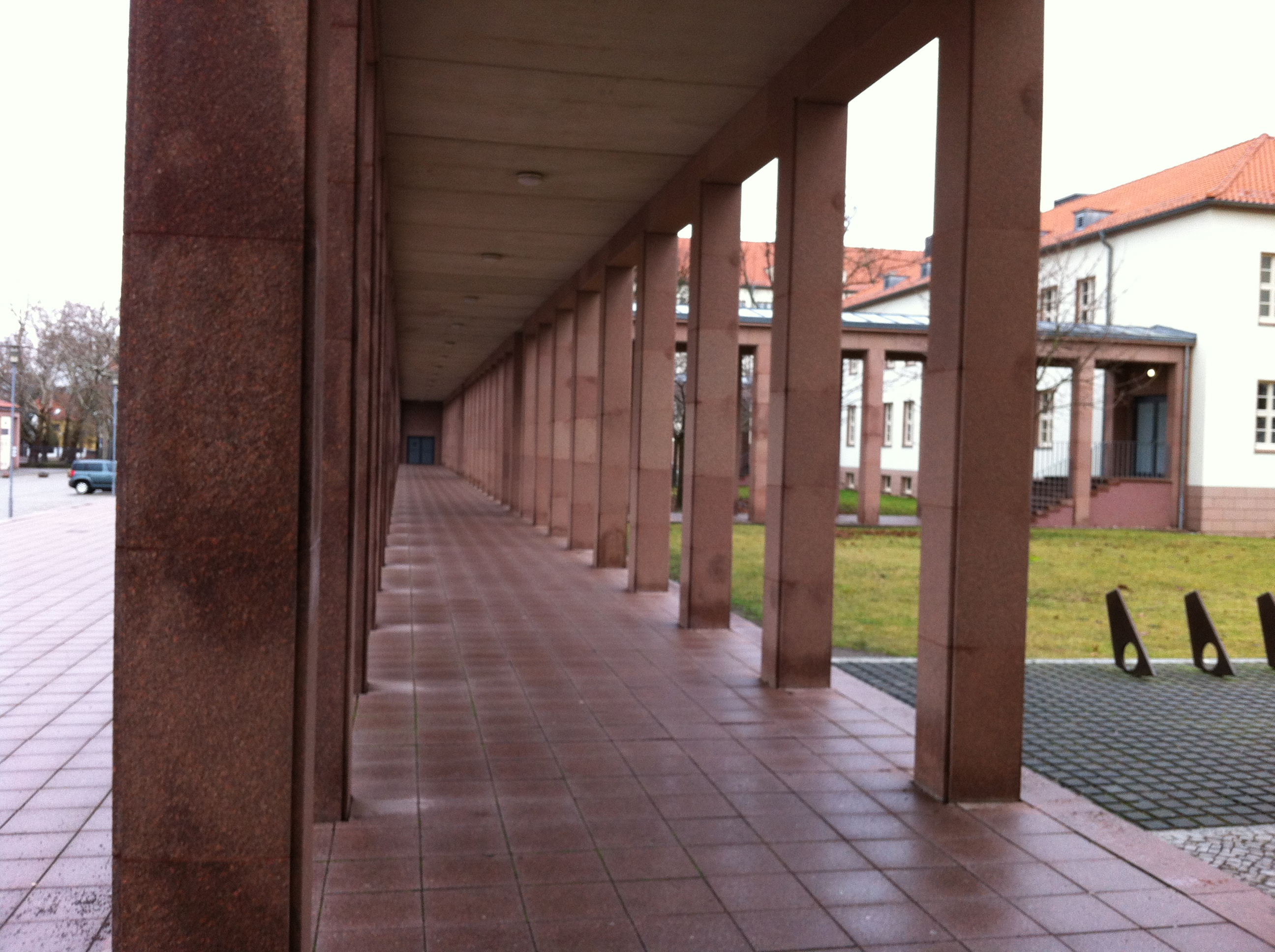
Colonnade of the southern school building.

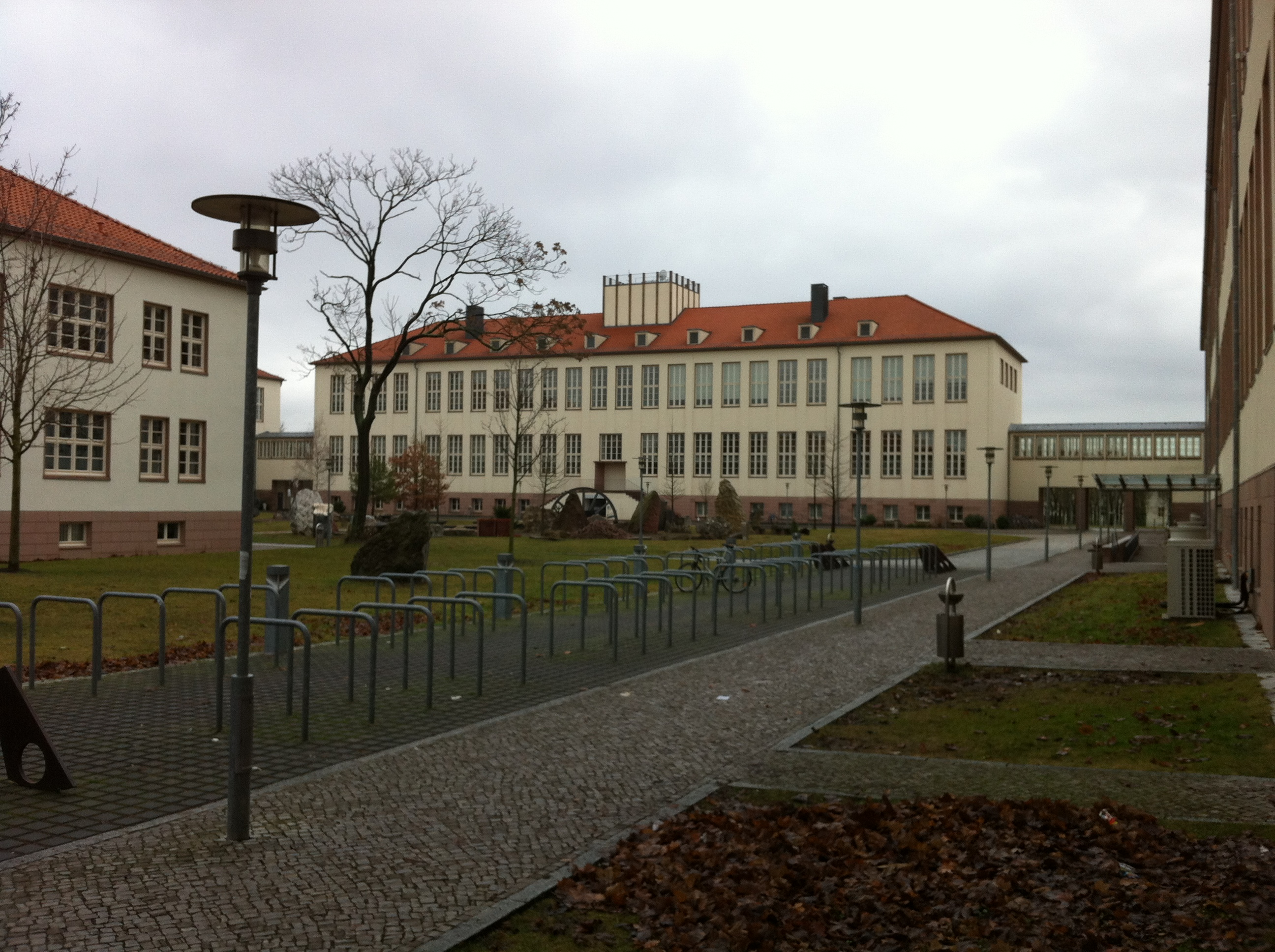
View into the southern three-wing school complex, in the courtyard of the Geological Garden.

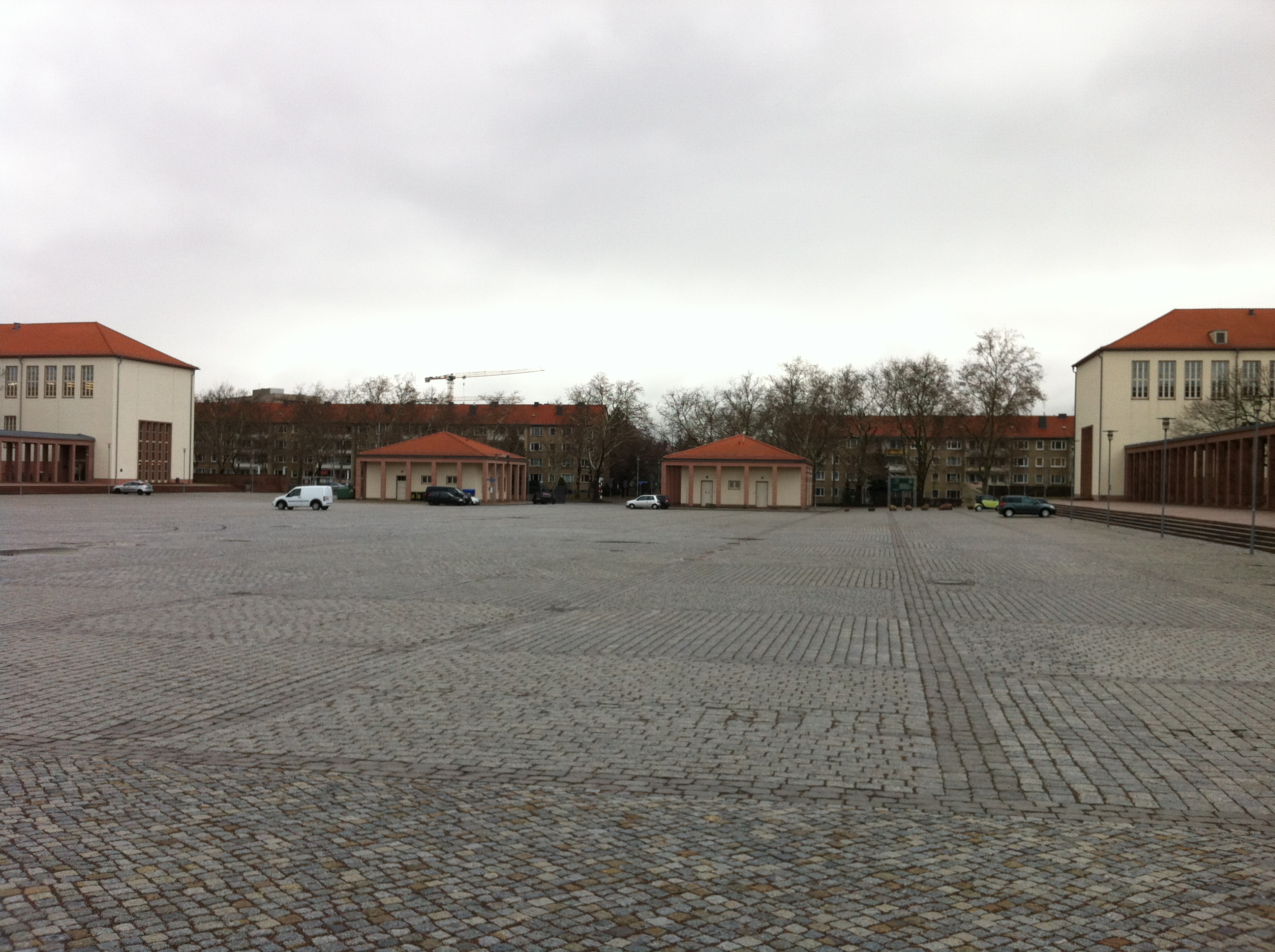
Former Appeal Square from the southwest with guard houses in the background.

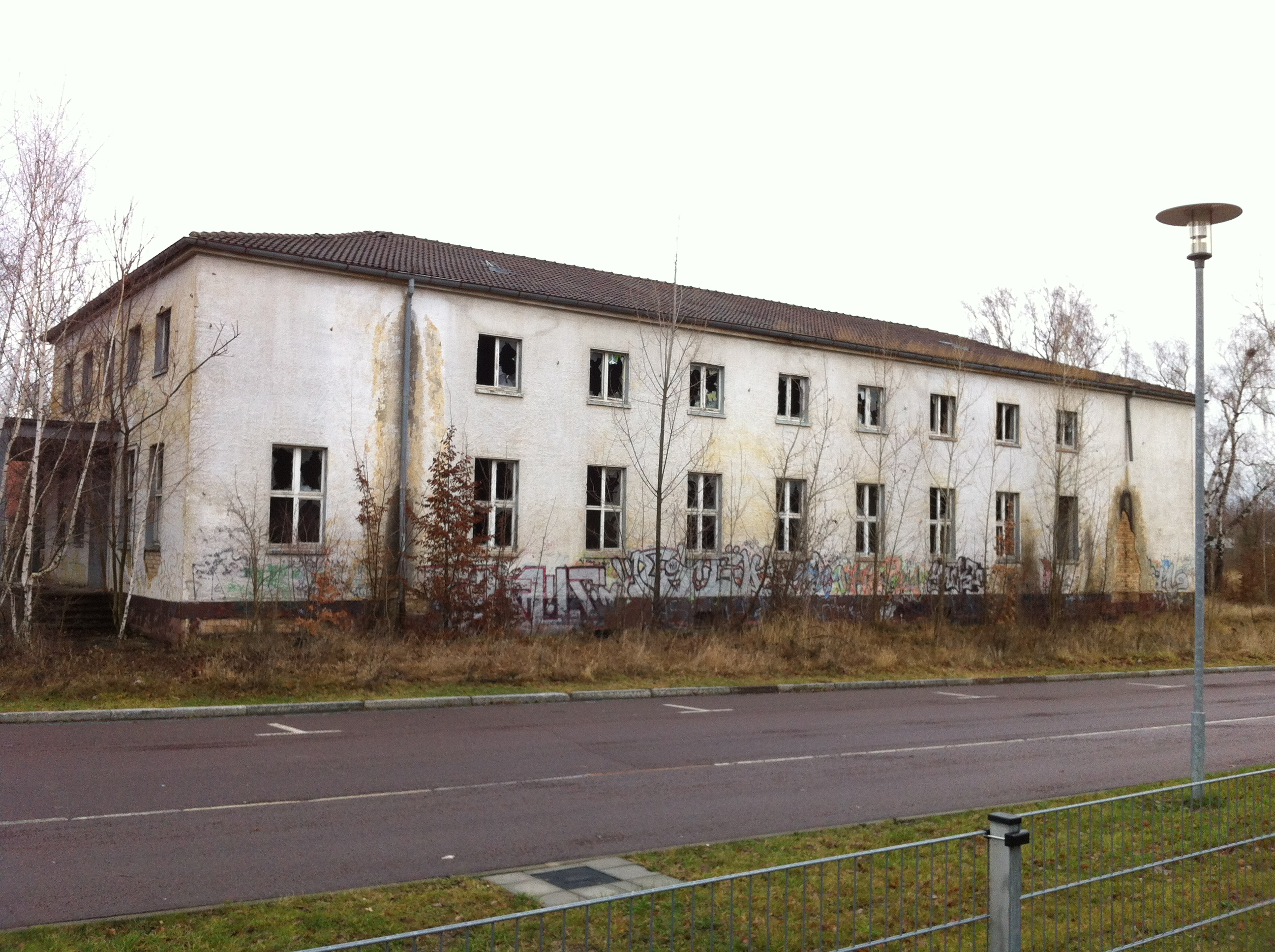
Former accommodation building of the Army and Air Force Signals School Halle. This was never renovated.
