= Horst Heilmann =

German resistance fighter against the Nazi regime (1923–1942)

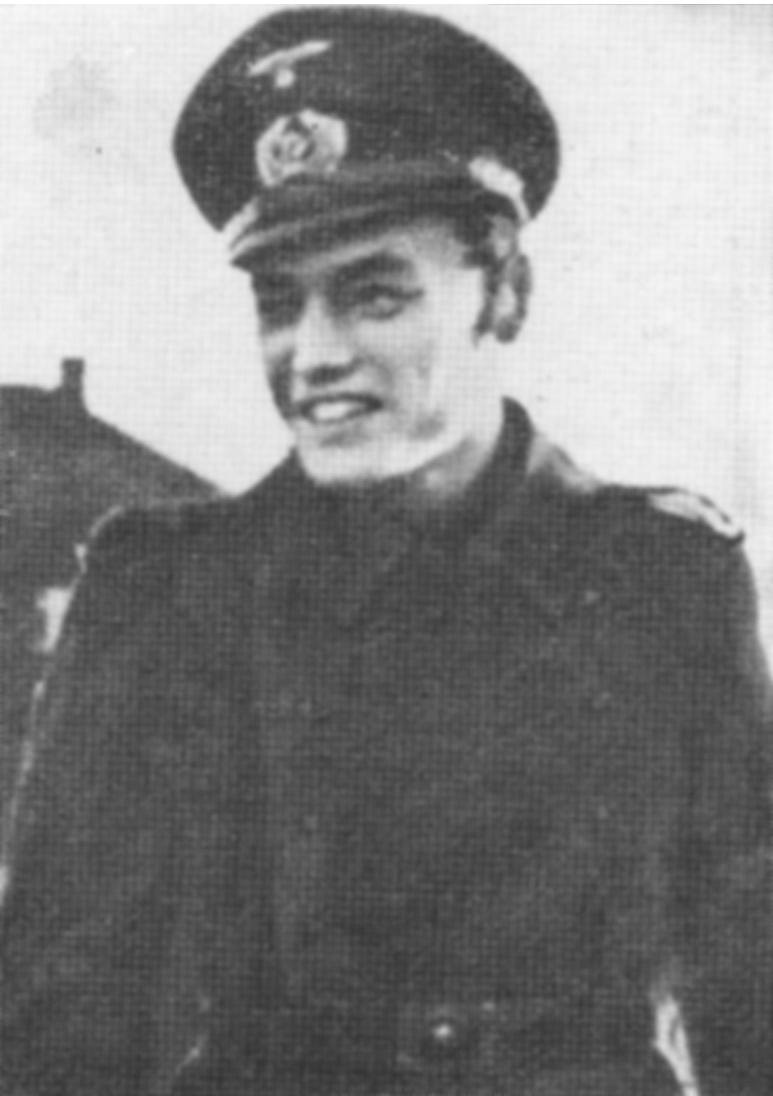
- Horst Heilmann
- Born: 15 April 1923; Dresden, Weimar Republic
- Died: 22 December 1942 (aged 19); Plötzensee Prison, Berlin, Nazi Germany
- Cause of death: Execution by guillotine
- Military career
- Allegiance: Nazi Party
- Inspectorate 7: Wehrmacht
- Rank: Lieutenant
- Unit: Funkabwehr
- Memorials: "NS-Opfer" by Johanna Jura, 1976, Unter den Linden 6, Berlin-Mitte, Germany 52° 31′ 04″ N, 13° 23′ 36″ E

Horst Heilmann (15 April 1923 – 22 December 1942) was a German resistance fighter against the Nazi regime. He was a member of the anti-fascist resistance group that formed around Harro Schulze-Boysen in 1940. Later, the people of the group along with many others were bundled together and called the Red Orchestra by the Abwehr. Heilmann was a student and a wireless operator who worked at the Referat 12 that was in the Inspectorate 7/VI.

== Life ==
Heilmann's father was Halle city architect Jakob Adolf Heilmann, and his mother was Helene Heilmann. Heilmann joined the Hitler Youth in 1937 and the Nazi Party in 1941. Heilmann was a student of Federal Foreign Office in Berlin until his conscription in the Wehrmacht. Heilmann's mother had ensured he learned a number of languages and this meant he was selected to be trained as a cryptologist and translator. After training, he was posted to the Inspectorate 7/VI, where he worked in Referat 7 and later Referat 1 before being posted to work at the Agents Referat, that later became Referat 12. At the Referat Heilmann worked on the desk that deciphered English, French and Russian intercept traffic.

== Schulze-Boysen ==
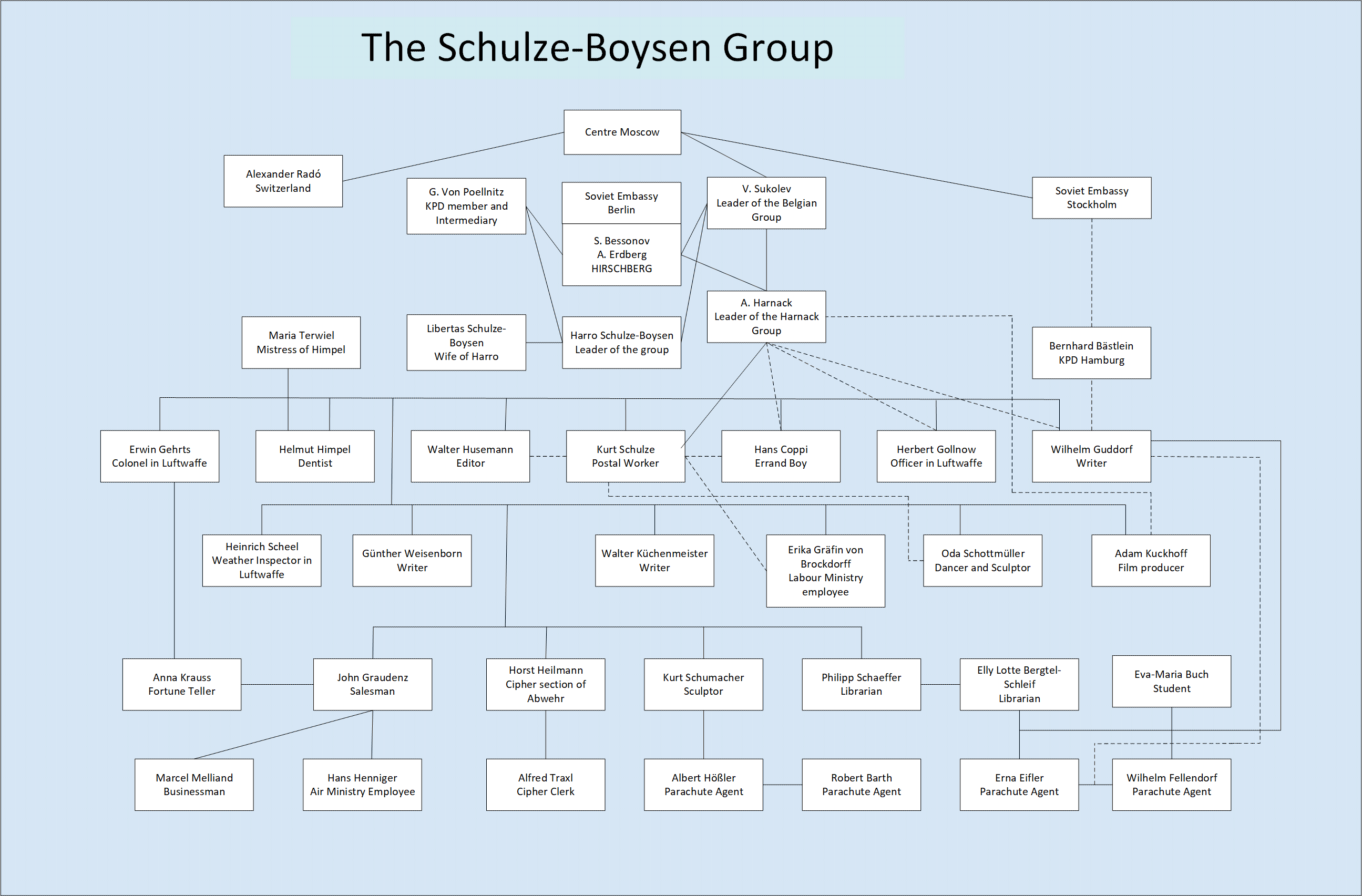
The Schulze-Boysen group in Germany

In 1940, Heilmann met Luftwaffe officer Harro Schulze-Boysen when Heilmann wrote a paper called The Soviets and Versailles that was presented at a political seminar for the Hitler Youth at the Deutsche Hochschule für Politik, where Schulze-Boysen was lecturing from September 1940. It was through Schulze-Boysen that Heilmann was introduced to Albrecht Haushofer, the German geographer, diplomat and later professor at the Faculty for Foreign Studies that had moved to the Humboldt University of Berlin and German resistance fighter who was also teaching at the seminar. Heilmann became a pupil of Haushofer.

This wasn't the first meeting between Schulze-Boysen and Haushofer but was perhaps the first political meeting. According to new evidence that was presented in 2010 Schulze-Boysen and Haushofer met at least twice before, and understood each other's motives, and allowed a compromise to be reached, that in turn enabled the turning of Heilmann away from Nazism. At Schulze-Boysen and Haushofer first meeting, also attended by Rainer Hildebrandt whose apartment they were using and another student, discussed the possibility of cooperation between Germany and the Soviet Union. At a second meeting, with trust established between two sides, Haushofer was known to tell Schulze-Boysen that an assassination attempt against Hitler was being planned. These two meetings created a level of trust between the two men that reduced their risk of exposure when trying to turn the Wehrmacht officer.

Heilmann who as communist had an ideology that was directly opposed to Haushofer who had a strong antipathy to Communism but through discussions between them about the possibility of West and East cooperation, that led to an accord, that eventually led to a friendship.

In August 1941, after a weekend sailing on the Großer Wannsee, on Schulze-Boysen's boat, the Duschika, Schulze-Boysen confided in Heilmann that he was working for the Russians as an agent.

For almost a year, Heilmann supplied information to the Schulze-Boysen and Harnack groups. At some point during that year, Heilmann tried to recruit Technical sergeant (German: Wachtmeister) Alfred Traxl but they remained colleagues instead of collaborators. Traxl was a former Czechoslovakia army soldier who survived the war and later became a salesman.

== Discovery ==
It was the discovery of the radio transmissions of Johann Wenzel who was captured by the Gestapo on 29–30 June 1942 that eventually revealed the members of the anti-fascist group and led to the arrest of Heilmann. When he was captured Wenzel decided to collaborate with the Funkabwehr and it was his exposure of the Wireless Telegraphy codes that enabled the Funkabwehr and specifically Referat 12 to decipher Red Orchestra message traffic. When Heilmann discovered that the Red Orchestra traffic was being read from documents that had been illegally provided by Alfred Traxl, he conducted a search for the names of Kuckoff, Schulze-Boysen and Harnack at the agency and to his horror after 2 days, he discovered that his friends had already been exposed to the Gestapo. According to one version of events Heilmann immediately phoned Schulze-Boysen, using Wilhelm Vauck's office phone that was next door to Heilmann office, as his phone was in use. As Schulze-Boysen wasn't in, Heilmann left a message with the maid of the household. When Schulze-Boysen returned, he immediately phoned the number, but unfortunately, it was answered by Vauck, who was Director of Referat 12. Vauck using the codes that Wenzel provided was able to captured and decipher over 200 radio messages that the Red Orchestra group had sent. The last message that was deciphered provided three addresses that were passed to the Reich Security Main Office IV 2A who easily identified the people living there, and from 16 July 1942 were put under surveillance. When Vauck answered he was astonished that the person who was prime subject of his investigation was on the phone and realised that Heilmann was a traitor. He asked Schulze-Boysen to clarify his name to confirm it was spelt with a y or an i. After the call, Vauck phoned the Gestapo and this started a process on 31 August 1942 that resulted in many people of the Red Orchestra being arrested, including Heilmann himself who was arrested on 5 September 1942.

== Arrest and execution ==
On 19 December 1942, the Reichskriegsgericht sentenced Heilmann to death, and on 22 December, Heilmann was guillotined at Plötzensee Prison.

== Post war ==
- His surviving friend in the fight against Nazism, Rainer Hildebrandt, wrote in his memoirs: "My best friends, Albrecht Haushofer and Horst Heilman, died in the Nazi Reich". Peter Weiss wrote about him in his novel The Aesthetics of Resistance.
- In Leipzig, Berlin, Halle, Aschersleben, and Bernburg streets are named after him. In 1976 a memorial wall was erected in the courtyard of the Humboldt University of Berlin at Unter den Linden 6, where his name is mentioned. In 2007 another tribute by Humboldt University of Berlin for Horst Heilmann was added.
- In 1970–1971, the film studio DEFA filmed episodes from the life of Horst Heilmann that was called KLK Calling PTZ – The Red Orchestra. The screenplay was written by Wera Küchenmeister and Claus Küchenmeister.
- Knud Romer describes in his literary bestseller Whoever blinks is Scared of Death: Roman the close relationship of his mother, who escaped with all luck the Nazi terror, to her former childhood friend Horst Heilmann and his murder in Plötzensee Prison as a colleagues of the resistance group Red Orchestra.

== Literature ==
- Coppi, Hans (1995). Harro Schulze-Boysen - Wege in den Widerstand eine biographische Studie [Harro Schulze-Boysen -Paths to the Resistance] (in German) (2nd ed.). Koblenz: Fölbach Verlag. ISBN 3-923532-28-8.
- Hildebrandt, Rainer (2003). ... die besten Köpfe, die man henkt" : Ein tragischer Auftakt zur deutschen Teilung und zur Mauer [he best mindsto behold: a tragic prelude to the German division and the wall] (in German). Berlin: Verlag Haus am Checkpoint Charlie. ISBN 978-3-922484-48-6.
- Perrault, Gilles (1994). Auf den Spuren der Roten Kapelle [In the footsteps of the Red Chapel] (in German). Vienna, Munich: Europaverl. ISBN 3-203-51232-7. OCLC 75468124.
- Rosiejka, Gert (1986). Die Rote Kapelle: 'Landesverrat' als antifaschistischer Widerstand [The Red Chapel: treason as anti-fascist resistance.] (in German) (1st ed.). Hamburg: Ergebnisse Verlag. ISBN 9783925622168. OCLC 497259004.
- Trepper, Léopold (1978). Die Wahrheit Autobiographie; mit 24 Bilds. u. zahlr. Dokumenten im Anh [The truth autobiography; with 24 pictures numbered. Documents in the appendix]. Dtv, 1387. (in German) (Unabriged ed.). Munich: Deutscher Taschenbuch-Verlag. pp. 120–375. ISBN 3-423-01387-7. OCLC 74449504.
- Roloff, Stefan (2004). Die Rote Kapelle: Die Widerstandsgruppe im Dritten Reich und die Geschichte Helmut Roloffs [The Red Chapel: the resistance group in the Third Reich and the story of Helmut Roloff] (in German) (1st ed.). Berlin: Ullstein. ISBN 3-548-36669-4. OCLC 76625534.
- Central Intelligence Agency (1979). The Rote Kapelle: The CIA's history of Soviet Intelligence and Espionage Networks in Western Europe, 1936–1945. Foreign intelligence book series. Maryland: University Publications of America. ISBN 0-89093-203-4. OCLC 25067686.
