= Funkabwehr =

Nazi radio counterintelligence body

The Funkabwehr, "Radio Defence Corps," was a radio counterintelligence organisation created in 1940 by Hans Kopp of the Armed Forces High Command during World War II. It was the principal body for the monitoring of illicit broadcasts. Its formal name was Funkabwehr des Oberkommandos der Wehrmacht (German: Oberkommando der Wehrmacht, Wehrmachtnachrichtenverbindungen, Funküberwachung) (OKW/WNV/FU). Its most notable breakthrough occurred on 26 June 1941, when tracing teams at the Funkabwehr station at Zelenogradsk discovered the Rote Kapelle, an anti-Nazi resistance movement in Berlin, and two Soviet espionage rings operating in German-occupied Europe and Switzerland during World War II. The Funkabwehr was dissolved on 30 April 1945.

== History ==
=== Purpose ===
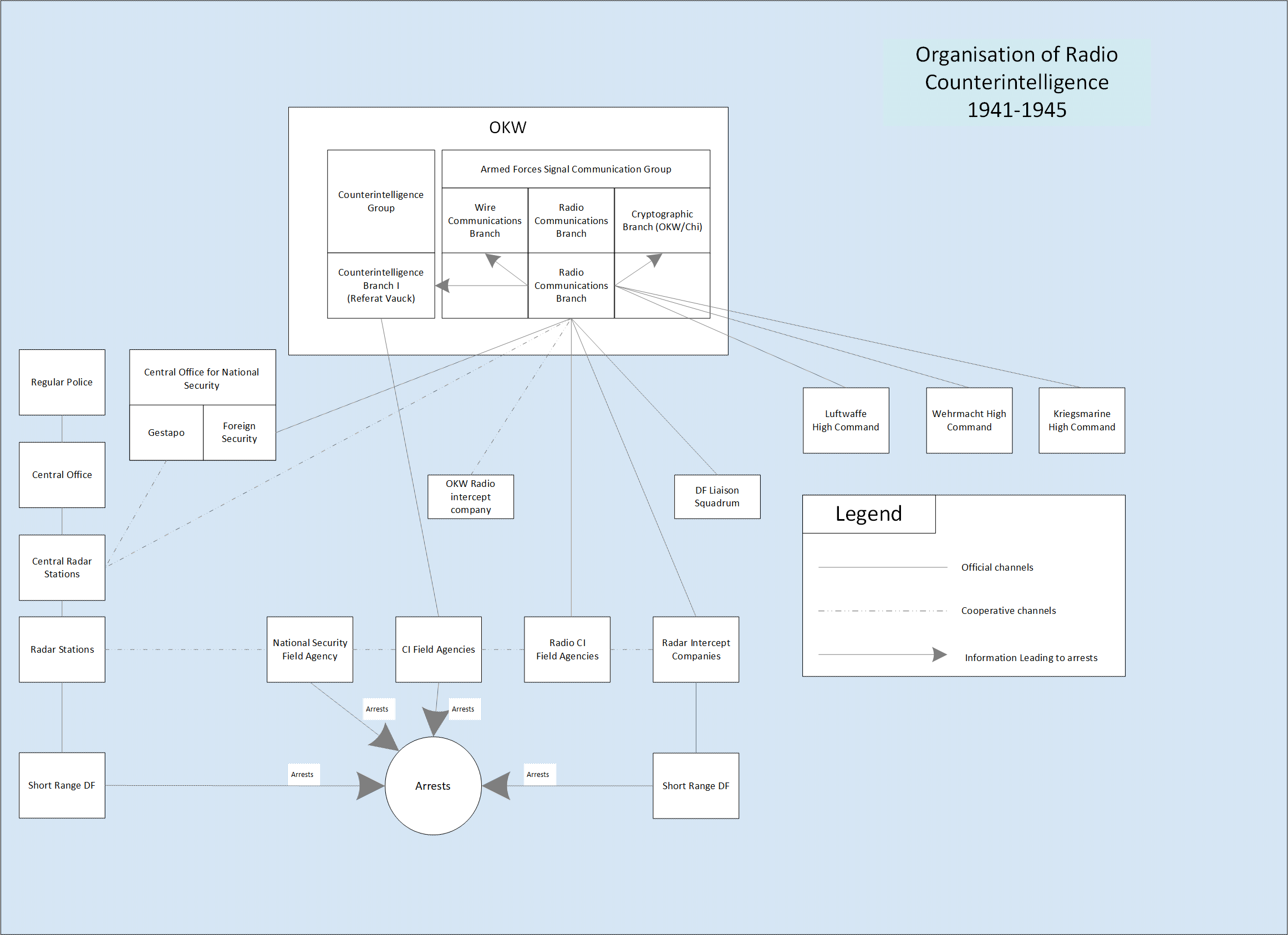
Organisational chart of the Funkabwehr from 1941 to 1945

The Radio Defence Corps of the OKW was given the task of picking up and locating by Direction finding (DF) transmitters of secret agents and other clandestine 'underground' transmitters. An underground transmitter was the secret radio station established in enemy-occupied territory. Such a station was charged with passing back to its control station, information of a military, political, or war-industrial nature obtained through espionage. This facilitates the carrying out of pick-up missions. Underground stations also pass traffic relative to the administration and supply of secret organisations and resistance groups. An underground transmitter is usually one of several belonging to a more or less large espionage organisation.

The moment a clandestine transmitter sends treasonable traffic, it becomes an underground station. A method of discovering a secret agent and clandestine traffic, according to radio intercept procedure, and fishing it out of the mass of regular traffic was only possible when every intercept operator, or at least every analysis station, had access to the full spectrum table of all known radio traffic.

It was the duty of the Radio Defence Corps to build up this spectrum table of recognised traffic, by working it out by all the organisations concerned. When all unaccounted traffic had been DFd, the underground station was exposed. The DF of underground and clandestine transmitters had to be accurate enough so that, on the basis of the bearings alone, the station was located and destroyed. By DF and Radio Intelligence, it could be determined what espionage cover-organisation each transmitter belonged to. By deciphering intercepted traffic of a given station before its extirpation, the following actions are undertaken by units of the Funkabwehr.

- Information was discovered and collected about the personnel and circle of acquaintances of the underground organisation.
- The technical and criminological aspects of the agents were discovered and collected.

By exercising rough DF-ing of the underground transmitter, the following could be accomplished:

- Determining the area of greatest espionage activity, from which can be concluded the areas of intended military activity.
- Plans made for the subsequent close-range fieldwork for the purpose of extirpating and rendering inoperative.

In the event that a so-called G-V Game, i.e. playback, was to be carried out, the Funkabwehr conducted the technical execution, while the information to be contained in the messages was furnished by the head office of the Reich Security Main Office, or Military High Command. To carry out a G-V Game means to have a captured enemy agent continue operations against the parent service which they had been previously operating. The fact that they are doing this must not become known to the original parent organisation. If the G-V Game was well carried out, it was possible to enter deeply into the parent organisation, such that the parent can be broken wide open. A good G-V game enabled future military organisations of the parent to be determined.

G-V Games in general could only be carried out when:

- The agent was thoroughly willing and able to work for you.
- Organisation and technique of the secret organisation the station belonged to, was known.
- The removal of the agent is either not known, or the group of people who know about it and are able to give the control station word of the circumstances, are captured.
- Special procedures, ciphers, WT procedures and all security measures of the agent or agents are known.

=== Status and liaison ===
==== Introduction ====
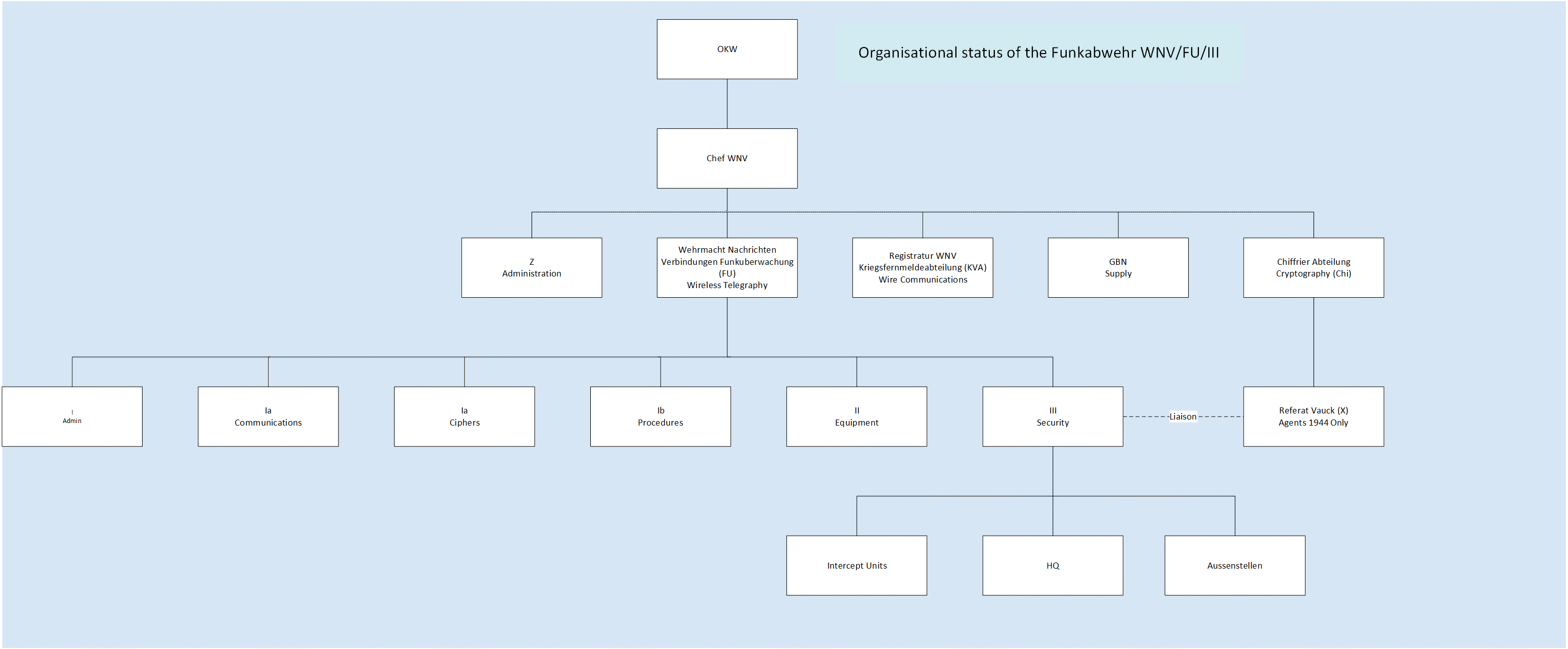
Organisation of the OKW/WFSt/WNV/FU/III

The Funkabwehr developed out of the (German: Horchdienst) or Listening Service, which was the German interwar radio intelligence and interception service, that was later expanded by the Funkabwehr, the Luftwaffe and the General der Nachrichtenaufklärung, early in the war, until by 1942, each service had an independent interception organisation. The Funkabwehr was an independent organisation whose head office was the department of the Oberkommando der Wehrmacht, specifically the OKW/WNV/FU.

The Funkabwehr consisted of three groups.

- Group I was the administration, organisation and tactical employment section.
- Group II was the technical supply and development of equipment as well as motor transport. It was also responsible for camouflage of vans and cars to change their effective use, i.e. to change their common shape and colour.
- Group III was operations and was the central clearing house for the analysis of agents' traffic. It was responsible for WT security and controlled the agencies that enforced it.

Group III consisted of the following:

- DF Plotting and evaluation section
- Office for agents' nets
- Office of unknown traffic
- Clandestine transmitters office
- Cryptanalysis office
- VHF evaluation section
- Fiesler Storch mission section
- Evaluation office
- Final analysis office

The Companies and intercept stations reported all DF bearing and intercepts directly by teletype to regimental level. The DF plotting and evaluation section made a central plotting of all bearings regardless of the net the stations belonged in. As the unit had to take DF bearings at great distances, the errors in maps affected accuracy to some degree. In order to remove or reduce errors, the exact locations, or triangles of error as a value, was calculated by a specialist called Dr. Dürminger.

Every day, the data for the next day were sent out by teleprinter to the subordinate units. The data consisted of frequencies, call signs, expected times of transmission and related information about the enemy traffic. Also included were the DF bearing fixes on enemy transmitters, which were calculated from the DF bearings supplied by the DF stations.

Rosters were also submitted that enabled the unit to work on the most advantageous possible allocation of frequencies. The DF Plotting and evaluation section handled the assignment of frequencies in the roster. In this way, the DF stations who were in the best geographic and technical position to take bearings on a given transmitter, were assigned the job and could be checked as to whether they had accomplished the discovery of the agent.

All matters pertaining to clandestine traffic were worked on by a section that had no particular subsection in charge of analysis. The technical spotting and removal of clandestine transmitters was the work of the Ordnungspolizei, known colloquially as the Orpo.

The most developed section was the Office of Unknown Traffic. It was considered the most important. Its work depended whether underground nets, which were operating with new traffic characteristics and new methods, could be spotted in time. The volume of unknown traffic was very large. A card index alone was not sufficient to document all the frequencies. A Hollerith (IBM section) was successfully used in this instance. The Office of Unknown Traffic worked with a large number of other organisations specifically involved in radio intelligence.

Deciphering and contents evaluation had conspicuous success, but the solving of traffic was almost always possible only when the code had been betrayed. Final analysts had the duty of:

- Furnishing the High Command with as much information as possible on military, war-industrial and political matters, passed by agents' transmitters.
- Providing guidance for the work of subordinate units and assigning to subordinate units the transmitters to be eliminated, but sometimes it was more important to read the traffic than to eliminate the transmitters.

Every month the Final Analysis section of the Funkabwehr forwarded a report to the High Command. During the last period of the war, the report was divided for security reasons into a report on the situation in the east, and a report on the west.

==== WNV/FU III ====
The OKW/WFSt/WNV/FU III (German: Oberkommando der Wehrmacht/Wehrmachtführungsstab/Amtsgruppe Wehrmachtnachrichtenverbindungen/Funkwesen III/Funkabwehr), the Radio Communication Group 3 of AgWNV, was the principal German unit dealing with signals security, the interception of clandestine traffic and the location, by technical means, of agents' transmitters. The WNV/FU (German: Wehrmachtnachrichtenverbindungen/Funkwesen) formed the wireless department of the signals directorate of the OKW.

As a department of the OKW, the WNV was theoretically in a position to issue directions through its chief to the signals organisations of each of the services. In the cases of the Kriegsmarine and the Luftwaffe, this power of direction was practically ineffective. In the case of the Army, there was closer coordination since the chief of the WNV combined this post with that of the chief of the army signals service of HNW (German: Heeresnachrichtenwesen) This position was held by Generaloberst Erich Fellgiebel, who was Director of the Code and Cipher section of the Defence Ministry from 1931 to 1932 and held of the office of dual combined office of Chef HNW and Chief Signal Officer Armed Forces (Chef WNF) from 1939 until 20 July 1944, with headquarters located in Dorf Zinna near Jüterbog. Thus it was possible for reasonably close liaison to be maintained between the WNV/FU III and the army intercept service. The intercept service provided the bulk of the personnel for the WNV/FU II and also did a certain amount of operational work on behalf of this organisation in the case of agent transmitters in the operational areas. The division of responsibility between the intercept service and the WNV/FU III in respect of traffic of partisans and saboteurs was not clearly defined, but in general the intercept service carried out such duties in operational areas.

==== Orpo Funkabwehrdienst ====
While the intercept service had its own specific tasks of a different nature from those of WNV/FU III and cooperation and overlapping between them were purely incidental, the duties of the WNV/FU III and the Funkabwehrdienst of the Ordnungspolizei (Orpo) were identical. Both were concerned with the location and apprehension of clandestine transmitters and, at least from the outbreak of war, it was impossible to distinguish between clandestine activities directed against the government and the regime. The sphere of the police monitoring units, which separately administered were controlled operationally by the central discrimination department of the WNV/FU III. This unity at the centre, the result of a specific order of the Führer, was not, however, accompanied by cooperation at the outstations. There was for instance in Paris, from the time of its occupation, both a branch control centre (German: Außenleitstelle) of WNV/FU and a radio direction finder (German: Funkmessstelle) of the Orpo; yet there appears to have been practically no contact between the two units while the members of one had but the haziest knowledge of the activities of the other. Similarly, while Aussenstellen of WNV/FU co-operated with the Funkmessstelle whose liaison was restricted to the Sicherheitspolizei.

During the year 1943, the Orpo established complete independence of the control of the OKW and this resulted in a fairly strict geographical division of responsibility between the intercept services of the police and those of the OKW. WNV/FU III assumed responsibility for northern France, Belgium and southern Netherlands, Italy, the Balkans and part of the eastern front. A distinct central discrimination and control centre was at the same time established by the Orpo in Berlin-Spandau, the chief of which was responsible to the Chief Signals Officer, Orpo and from then on the theoretical independence of the two organisations was complete. Co-ordination was maintained by a Joint Signals Board in Berlin, under the chairmanship of Chef WNV, Erich Fellgiebel, which dealt with matters of general organisation. It would appear that in practice, however, reasonably close liaison was maintained between the two HQs; it was at least as sufficiently close for a common block of numbers to be retained in referring to commitments, for although such numbers were nominally issued by the Joint Signals Board, in practice they must have emanated from WNV/FU III.

==== Cryptography ====
The cryptographic organisation which might logically have been expected to have handled the material provided by WNV/FU was its sister organisation the WNV/Chi. This department was primarily concerned with the provision of ciphers for the OKW and deciphering of political and diplomatic material, for the latter purpose it controlled its own long-range intercept stations. It did not, however, have any special section set aside for clandestine traffic and, during the first two years of the war, although it received material intercepted by WNV/FU, this appears to have received scant attention and results were negligible. This state of affairs led the officers of WNV/FU both to press the claims of their work with WNV/CHI with a view to the establishment of a special section in this department to handle agent ciphers and also to look around for cryptanalysis assistance from other quarters. Their requests were rejected by the OKW/Chi on the grounds of shortage of man-power but they succeeded in gaining the interest and cooperation of Inspectorate 7/VI (In 7/VI) of the army. In the spring of 1942 however, a new special section was established as Referat 12 in In 7/VI to handle agent traffic. This development coincided with the posting to In 7/VI of Oberleutnant Wilhelm Vauck, a cryptanalyst of great ability, who became Director of the new Referat 12.

From this time onwards, Referat 12 worked in close contact with WNV/FU III and handled all the traffic intercepted by the organisation. It also assisted in solving the call sign systems and code procedures. Some contact appears still to have taken place with OKW/Chi but this was on a purely consultative nature and it was Referat 12 which undertook the day to day cryptanalysis work of WNV/FU III. This theoretically anomalous position was rectified at the end of 1943, when WNV/FU III moved to Jüterbog with Referat 12 being transferred to the same location. At the same time, Referat 12 was detached from In 7/VI and incorporated in WNV/CHI as Referat X. This change was little more than nominal and no way affected the work of Referat 12 or its contact with WNV/FU III.

==== Intelligence ====
The normal channels of contact for intelligence and executive operations were, in the case of WNV/FU III, Abwehr III and the GFP and in the case of Orpo units, the Sicherheitsdienst (SD) and the Gestapo. This liaison appears to have worked sufficiently well for normal operational purposes. The commander of Abwehr Leistelle III West stated that relations between their units and local units of the WNV/FU III were always very close and that valuable assistance had been given and received by both sides. However, the degree of cordiality and confidence involved varied considerably with personalities and in many cases mutual distrust between offices prevented all but the most formal and essential collaboration.

== Organisation ==
At the outbreak of the war, the technical resources of the Funkabwehr appeared to have consisted of no more than a few small fixed intercept stations and mobile short-range DF units. These were, for the most part, Orpo units, as were the available long-range DF stations, though military and naval DF stations also assisted in security tasks. This organisation was quite insufficient and unprepared to deal with the increased responsibilities resulting from the early German victories and the increase in the size of occupied territory. At the same time, the number of Allied W/T agents in occupied areas was constantly growing.

=== Intercept companies formation ===
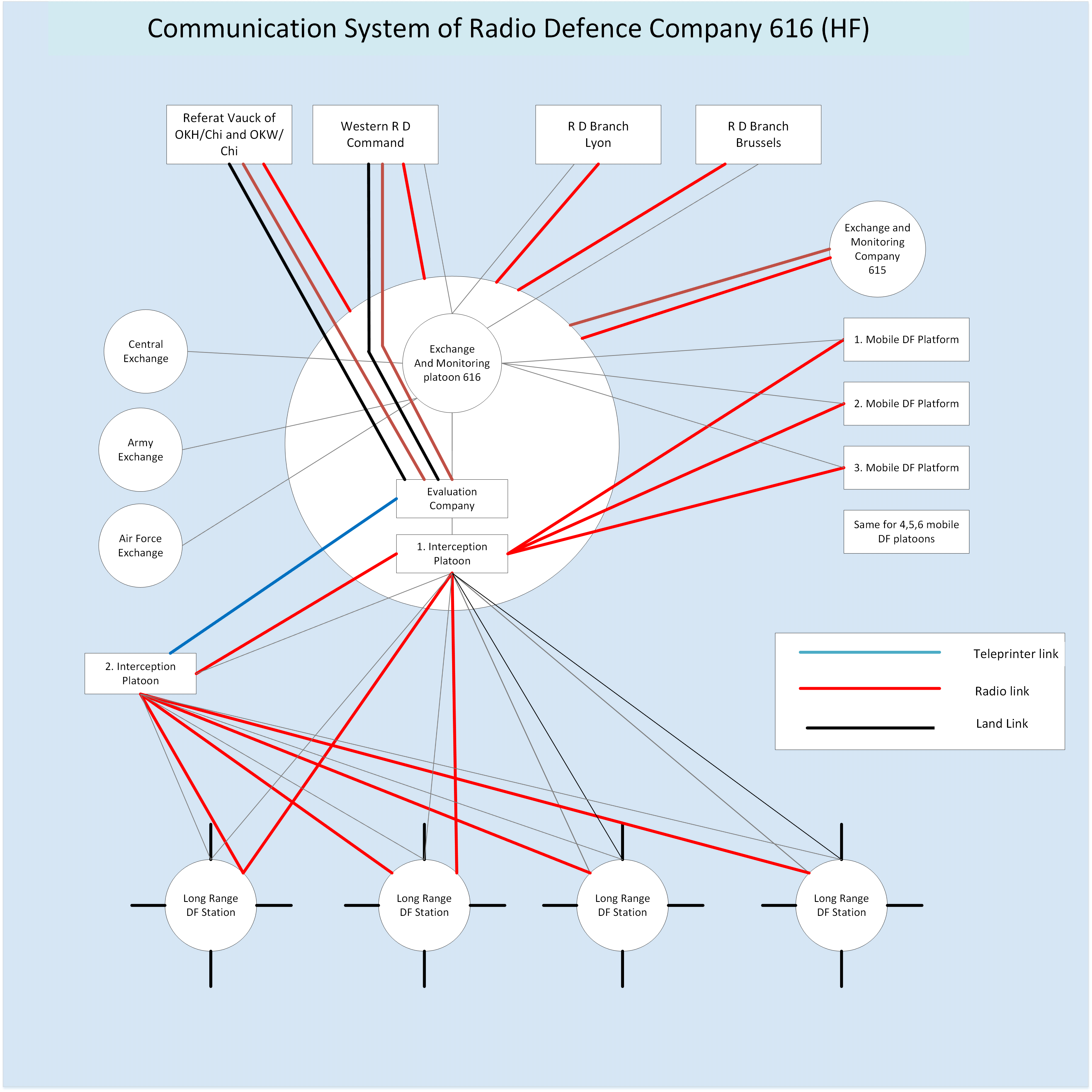
Communication diagram of radio defence company 616, that operated in Northern France and the low countries

To meet this situation after the Western Campaign in 1940, companies were taken from the Army intercept service (General der Nachrichtenaufklärung), reorganised and re-equipped for security intercept work and placed under the control of WNV/FU III. They continued to carry their former intercept company numbers. Five such companies were formed, two being created initially in early 1942 from the Luftwaffe intercept service to cover the Balkans. These radio monitoring (German: Funküberwachungs) companies formed the principal operational resources of the Funkabwher.

These were geographically placed as follows:

- 612 Intercept Coy Poland and Soviet Union. One platoon maintained in France, one in Denmark.
- 615 Intercept Coy Norway and Western Europe
- 616 Intercept Coy North France, Belgium, South Netherlands
- 1 Luftwaffe Special Intercept Coy Northern Balkans and Italy
- 1 Luftwaffe Special Intercept Coy Southern and eastern Balkans

=== Aussenstellen ===
Operational control of the intercept companies was exercised by the (German: Außenstellen), branch offices of WNV/FU. These Ausenstellen represented WNV/FU as a whole and therefore were responsible for the maintenance of the OKW Wireless telegraphy communication and other duties of the organisation as well as for intercept matters. However, they contained an FU III staff, known as the (German: Überwachungsstab) which dealt with Funkabwehr questions. The Aussenstellen acted as the link between the headquarters in Berlin and the Intercept Companies and directed the activities of the latter. They were also responsible for local discrimination and cryptography and for liaison with other organisations.

Aussenstellen were located in Paris, Lyon, Brussels and Oslo in the west and in Vienna, Warsaw, Rome, Prague, Athens, Belgrade, Bratislava, Klagenfurt and Varna in the east and south-east. There were established in a progressive manner, with Paris being established in 1940, Brussels in September 1943. The stations in Paris and Vienna were considered control centres (German: Leitstellen) for the branch control centres, the Aussenstellen, within their areas. In a number of cases, the location of the Aussenstellen were moved in conformity with the withdrawal of the German armed forces, as the war progressed.

==== Intercept companies organisation ====
Responsibility for the Intercept Companies was subordinated to the Officer for Radio Control West Europe(German: Offizier für Funkabwehr West-Europa) in the western theatre and for the eastern front, Officer for Radio Control Eastern Europe (German: Offizier für Funkabwehr Ost-Europa). There does not appear to have been an equivalent post in connection with the Luftwaffe Intercept Companies of WNV/FU III on the Balkans and Italy, and these probably came under the control of the Officer for Radio Control Eastern Europe. The branch offices were quite independent of the Offizier für Funkabwehr, although they exercised operation control of the Intercept Companies. The Offizier für Funkabwehr were in fact, HQ administrative officers who dealt with the daily administration and supply to the Intercept Companies, while the Aussenstellen, or branch offices acted as independent staffs for intelligence and liaison and to some extent for discrimination and cryptography, receiving intelligence from the intercept units and issuing commitments to them, but not holding executive control over them.

The final reorganisation occurred during the summer of 1944, when the prospect of Allied invasion in the west and other fronts, made all static intelligence units in operational areas unsuitable for the conditions they were likely to encounter. To meet these condition, all units of the Abwehr were rendered mobile and subordinated to the operational HQ of the Wehrmacht fighting forces, while retaining their own channels of communication between mobile units and central HQ. An exactly parallel development took place with the Funkabwehr. The Aussenleitstellen in Paris and Vienna were reorganised into mobile units and were renamed to (German: Funküberwachungsabteilung I) or Wireless Surveillance Department, for the western unit, unit II for the south-east. The Warsaw unit was converted into Fünkuverwachungs Abt III, covering the east. Each Fünkuverwachungs Abt was directly subordinated to the (German: Höherer Nachrichtenführer) (C.S.O), Intelligence HQ, of their respective commands, but in all other respects their status and functions remained unchanged. The remaining Aussenstellen were similarly reorganised on a mobile basis (German: Verbindungsorgane) but otherwise continued to carry out their former duties. The duties of the Offizier für Funkabwehr were unchanged by the reorganisation.

In the autumn of 1944, all intercept companies of the WNV/FU III were organised into a regiment called the Supervisory (German: Überwachungs) Regiment, that was part of OKW. The regiment was under the command of an Oberstleutnant de Bary, the gruppenleiter and executive chief of WNV/FU III. This change was exactly parallel to the formation slightly earlier of the Nachrichten Regiment 506 under Major Poretschkin to include the whole of the signals staff of the Mill.Amt. of the Reich Security Main Office (RSHA). Both were purely administrative changes and the command, deployment and duties of the intercept companies was in no way affected.

==== Orpo intercept companies ====
The intercept organisation of the Orpo developed along similar lines to those taken by units directly controlled by WNV/FU III. At the outbreak of the war, the Orpo controlled six small intercept and four DF stations in the Reich. This organisation was expanded rapidly with the increase of the German-occupied territory. The first Orpo intercept unit moved into Norway in May 1940 and into the Netherlands shortly afterwards, expansion into France, Poland and the Soviet Union followed later. These first units were extremely small: the unit that was sent to Norway consisted of initially three men only, while in November 1941, the Orpo station in Netherlands consisted of no more than four intercept banks, but expansion was fairly rapid and by 1943, each Orpo company approximated the size of the OKW Intercept Company. Three companies existed by this time covering respectively France and the Netherlands, Norway and the Eastern Front. The Orpo Companies were known as police radio reconnaissance Companies (German: Polizei-Funkaufklärungskompanien).

For administration and discipline Orpo intercept units came under the local C.S.O. of the Orpo. Operationally, they were controlled by the evaluation centre of the WNV/FU III in Berlin, though the Police Radio Control Centre in Berlin, that was disguised as an office in the Police Technical School, appears to have acted as a post between the WNV/FU III and the Orpo units. Doubtless by this means, the principle was maintained that Orpo units received orders only through their own hierarchy. The part played by the Aussenstellen of WNV/FU III in the work of the Orpo companies varied considerably from place to place. In Norway, the Oslo Aussenstellen played an active role, as it received all reports of the Orpo company and arranged cooperation for it from the fighting forces. While relations did not appear to have been too happy, Norway seemed to be the one area in which something approaching a single joint intercept service under police predominance was established. On both the western and eastern fronts, however, the Orpo units operated quite independently of the Aussenstellen, while in the eastern theatre, they maintained close contact in dealing with partisan traffic with KONA 6.

The main reorganisation of the Orpo Intercept service took place during 1943. The post office work of the Radio Control Centre at Berlin was expanded into an independent discrimination and control centre known as the German: Funkmessleitstelle Berlin. This nevertheless continued to cooperate closely with the WNV/FU III and, through the latter, with the cryptographers of Referat Vauck that was run by Wilhelm Vauck. At the same time the HQ of the companies in France, Norway and the Soviet Union were organised respectively into Funkmessleitstelle West, Funkmessleitstelle Nord and Funkmessleitstelle Ost. The HQ of the intercept units in the Netherlands were sometimes referred to as German: Funkmessstelle West, though in practice it exercised considerable independence. The Funkmessstelle controlled the intercept companies and acted as forward discrimination and liaison staff. They thus performed for the Orpo intercept units almost exactly the same function as the Aussenstellen did for the OKW, except that the Funkmessstelle were in direct command of their subordinate units and there was not in the Orpo organisation any equivalent of the Officer for Radio Control in WNV/FU III.

=== Headquarters and Aussenstellen ===
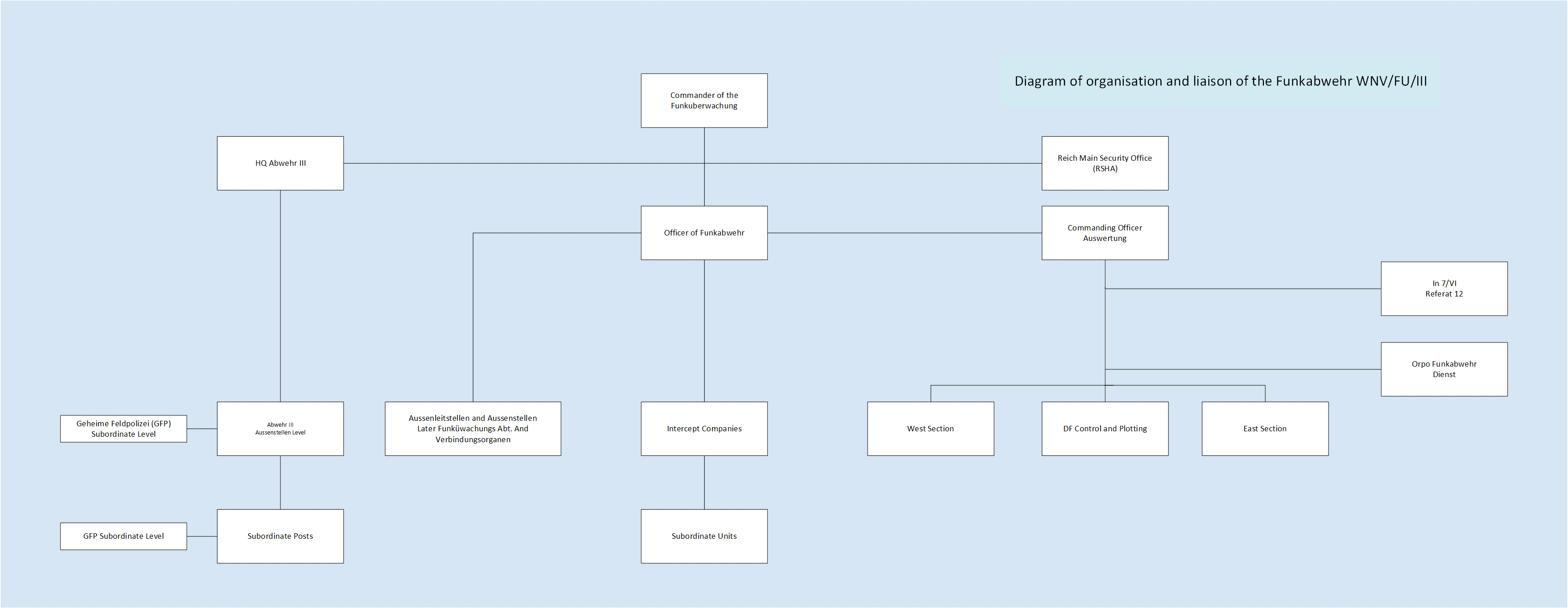
Diagram of organisation and liaison of the WNV/FU/III

The HQ of the WNV/FU III appeared to have two primary roles. The roles were executive and administrative control of the subordinate intercept units and discrimination of their results and of those of the Orpo Funkabwehrdienst. A third function was the central representation of the security intercept service vis-a-vis other departments, of which the cryptographic sections were by far the most important. The execution of these duties gave to the central headquarters of the WNV/FU III theoretically complete operational control over the whole of the service, but in practice this was to a considerable extent modified on the one hand by the jealously guarded independence of the Orpo service and on the other by the deliberate devolution of the functions of the central headquarters on to the Aussenstellen.

As in most departments of the German operational war effort, a fairly rigorous division was made between the eastern and western theatres of war. Thus under the Gruppenleiter Major von Bary, there was separate administrative and discrimination sections for both the east and the west. A parallel division was made maintained in the cryptographic work of the Referat Vauck.

The administrative and executive control of the intercept units in their respective zones was the responsibility of the two Offizier für Funkabwehr, who were subordinated to the Gruppenleiter. Their offices and staffs were at the central headquarters, but they spent a considerable portion of their time visiting the units they were in command of. Their main duties consisted in the provision of personnel and equipment for the companies. FU/III had no equipment depot or workshops of its own, all equipment being drawn from FU/II which formed the central body for all provision of equipment to all departments of WNV/FU. For this purpose the officer for radio control presumably maintained contact with this department.

The Offizier für Funkabwehr did not have any responsibility for the central Auswertung or discrimination section or for the Aussenstellen, though they presumably maintained fairly close contact with the officers in charge of these.

The Auswertung had a single chief but was organised into east and west sections. These were responsible for the central discrimination of all signals and traffic forwarded by the Aussenstellen, the intercept units and the Orpo Funkmessleitstelle. This work included the allotment of numbers to transmissions frequencies covered, allocation of tasks and control of the fixed D/F network for which a separate section existed. Central records and case histories of all commitments were maintained and the Auswertung passed all traffic received to the appropriate section of Referat Vauck. This department was located close to WNV/FU III and cooperation between the two staffs appeared to be intimate. Referat Vauck gave considerable assistance in analysing changing Call sign and QRX systems and similar coded W/T procedures. Details of all W/T communications other than those the army were passed to the Auswertung for discrimination purposes.

The headquarters of WNV/FU III was often referred to as the Arbeitstab Bary after the Gruppenleiter. Cover-names were often employed in communications referring the headquarters, or its subordinate units. Cover-names were also used by personnel in neutral countries and by the more important members of the headquarters staff, such as Major von Bary. The latter correct title was Commander of Radio Intelligence (German: Kommandeur der Funküberwachung) OKW. In the autumn of 1943, the headquarters moved to Dorf Zinna. The final movements of the department are somewhat confused. It appears to have been transferred to Halle at the beginning of 1945 and later south Germany. There are reports of the remnants of units subordinated to Major von Wedel at Lake Constance. Throughout all these moves FU/III was accompanied by the cryptographers of Referat Vauck both in Inspectorate In 7/VI as Referat 12 and in OKW/CHI as Referat X.

The Aussenstellen represented WNV/FU as a whole and that it was only the intercept personnel (German: Überwachungstäbe) which were primarily concerned with intercept work. The proportion which this represented of the work of the Aussenstellen varied from case to case, though by the time that the Radio Surveillance Departments (German: Funküberwachungsabteilungen) were created they appear to have been almost exclusively engaged in these duties. FU/III provided the personnel for the intercept work at the Aussenstellen, but otherwise it had no responsibility for the administration of the latter which came for this purpose under WNV/FU/I.

The Aussenstellen carried out locally for the intercept units in their areas the discrimination and allocation duties which were performed centrally by the Auswertung at headquarters. This policy of devolution of functions to the Aussenstellen appears to have been deliberately undertaken to avoid the loss of time involved in handling all material in Berlin. A second advantage was that the personnel of the Aussenstellen could gain a far clearer and more detailed understanding of the local C.E. position and so were better placed to coordinate the work of the intercept units with Abwehr III and the other security services in their areas. The allotment of numbers to commitments remained throughout a function of the central office which received traffic and wireless telegraphy intercept material from the Aussenstellen and to some extent direct from the intercept companies, and kept records and case histories which were presumably more or less duplicates of those compiled at the Aussenstellen. Task allocation appears to have been carried out by both the Aussenstellen and headquarters, though the former naturally tended to predominate in all operations against local agents. It was in directing the activities of the Funkabwehr machinery in conformity with the requirements of the local C.E. authorities that the principal function of the Aussenstellen was to be found.

A further devolutionary step was taken during the winter of 1942-1943 when cryptanalysts from Referat 12 were attached to the Aussenstellen of WNV/FU III. Previously all traffic had been forwarded by a roundabout route from intercept units through Aussenstellen and headquarters Auswertung to Referat 12. In the case of traffic that was being currently read this imposed great delays when the solved message might be locally of immediate operational value. To counter this, cryptographers were first sent to Aussenstelle Paris to solve such traffic on the spot, and the same policy was shortly afterwards adopted in the case of other Aussenstellen. One or two cryptanalysts were usually sent to each Aussenstellen and remained there for a period of eight weeks, when they were subsequently replaced. They worked only with the traffic that had already been solved and in all other cases the raw material continued to be sent direct to Berlin. Relations between cryptanalysts and the regular staff of the Aussenstellen was not always considered a happy work environment. In Paris, the senior officer of the Aussenstellen attempted to train some members of his own staff in cryptology to take over these duties. However, the system remained in place until the end of the war.

Aussenleitstelle Paris contained a local staff of about fifteen including a technical officer and a discriminator with two assistant clerks. In addition the special staff of Auswertung Ursula dealing with VHF material (Techniques) was attached from the end of 1943. A liaison officer was subordinated to Leitstelle III West and Non-commissioned officers partly drawn from the intercept companies were attached to some of the subordinate units. The Aussenleitstelle, now Radio Surveillance Department I (German: Funküberwachungsabteilung I), left Paris in early August, 1944 for Idar-Oberstein and moved shortly thereafter to Gobelnroth in Giessen where it remained.

The majority of the other Aussenstellen were similarly organised though only the unit in Oslo contained any special staff concerned with VHF. Aussenstelle Athens was merged with Aussenleitstelle Süd Ost (South East) in Vienna in mid 1943. Aussenstelle Süd in Lyon appeared to be slightly abnormal. The staff of the Aussenstelle proper totalled three, including the commanding officer, one cryptanalyst from Referat Vauck, with a small intercept station under its control. It was established in April 1943 to combat the resistance movement in southern France and was at first known as Sonderkommando A.S (Armée secrète). It was essentially a mobile unit and visited numerous placed in southern France, principally Marseille and Lyon, until it finally settled in Lyon. It appears to have carried out most of the normal functions of an Aussenstelle and was primarily concerned with advising the C.E. authorities in running playbacks.

Personnel of both the HQs and the Aussenstellen of WNV/FU were for the most part drawn from a special training depot for linguists signallers which supplied any special needs for this type of personnel of the OKW and the Army Signals services. The staff of Referat Vauck was mainly drawn from the same source. This depot started as the 9th (dolmetscher) Company of the Heer and Luftwaffe Signals School in Halle. In early 1941, the whole school moved to Leipzig where it was attached to (German: Nachrichtenlehrregiment) and at the same time, the 9th company was expanded to form the 9th and 10th companies. In May of the same year, the two companies were transferred to Meissen and later reorganised into three companies called (German: Nachrichtendolmetscherersatzabteilung). This rapid expansion was due to the heavy calls made on the depot, but due to chronic manpower shortages, suffered across all of Germany, the Funkabwehr was always in difficulties through shortage of manpower.

=== Intercept companies ===
Intercept and DF unit locations
German Army	Ordnungspolizei
HQ Berlin	Berlin-Spandau
Hannover	Oldenburg
Zelenogradsk	Konstanz
Køge	Vienna
Brussels	Prague
Brest, Belarus	Sovetsk, Kaliningrad Oblast
Tallinn	Warsaw
Graz	Krakau
Paris	Oslo
Ladispoli	Trondheim
Greece	Amsterdam

The only intercept companies of which reasonably accurate details as to composition and strength exist are two air force companies formed in 1942 to cover the Balkans. Each of these consisted initially of a small discrimination sections, an Auswertung, an intercept station of ten double bank positions (German: Überwachungsstelle), a long-range DF platoon (German: Fenfeldzug) and a short-range DF platoon (German: Nahfeldzug). Each short range DF platoon contained five sections, each of two DF cars. Including administrative staff, the total strength of each company was about 130 including command.

After the Armistice of Cassibile, Company No. 1 became responsible for Italy, while retaining part of its sphere of activity in the Balkans. This necessitated the creation of a new short-range D/F platoon and additions to the long-range intercept and DF strength. Intercept stations were established at Recoaro Terme and Treviso where there was also a long-range DF unit. The short-range DF platoon was split into two squads, one being maintained at Rome until the evacuation, the other in Venice and Treviso areas.

The units in Italy were directed operationally by Aussenstelle Italy of WNV/FU, which was established simultaneously, first in Rome, later in Verona, but they remained under command 1 Special Intercept Company headquarters in Belgrade.

While in Athens No.2 Company established its main receiving stations first at Phalerum and later at Ekáli. Discrimination and technical direction of the company was centred here, though the actual headquarters were in the city for more convenient contact with Aussenstelle Athens and other C.E. and intercept agencies. One bank intercept posts were maintained at Ioannina, Thebes, in the Morea and Crete and possibly Samos. The last named, though certainly projected, may never have been established. The long-range DF station was located at Loutsa, which seemed to have been an important centre for all German Intercept services. In addition, the company could call on the Luftwaffe DF station at Kifissia, a naval station at Kalamaki and possibly others. In July 1943, No. 2 company moved its headquarters and monitoring unit from Athens to Sofia, the long-range DF station being established in Kavala, a year later a further move was made to Bucharest. Throughout these moves the short-range DF platoon of the company remained behind, first in the Athens and Salonika area and later moving back with the withdrawal of the German forces.

These Balkan companies underwent considerable changes of organisation which were not exactly paralleled in other areas. In September 1944, both companies were withdrawn to Jüterbog and combined into a single new intercept company, Funkhorch Kp. with a receiving station of twenty banks, discrimination section and long-range DF network. The close-range DF units were omitted from the new intercept company and were formed into a special DF company to operate in Italy and the Balkans. This company was expanded to a strength of four platoons stationed in Udine, Padua, Milan and Bratislava. The reorganisation of the Luftwaffe intercept companies did not effect their operational direction and remained under the command of WNV/FU III and received operational directions from (German: Funküberwachungsstab II), that was the former Ausenleitstelle Süd-Ost, in Vienna and from its subordinate Verbindungsorgane at Klagenfurt, Verona and Bratislava.

Knowledge of the size and movements of the intercept companies provided by the army is far less extensive. 612 and 616 intercept companies appear similar in composition to those in the Balkans, but 612 was on a far larger scale. The main effort of this company was concentrated on the Eastern Front, with the HQ in Zelenogradsk. It was responsible for the whole of the front except those areas of Poland and the central sectors which were covered by the Orpo. It contained at least four monitoring stations located at points stretching from the Baltic states to Constanța and it had an equivalent complement of long-range and mobile DF platoons. Also nominally part of the company was a mobile DF platoon stationed in Bordeaux and an intercept station, long-range DF unit and mobile close-range platoon based in Køge in Denmark. For all operational purposes, however, these units were subordinated to the Offizier für Funkabwehr Europa and had no connection with the parent unit. The platoon in Bordeaux was directed by the Aussenleitstelle Paris while the Denmark unit was commanded directly by WNV/FU II. An intercept station of four banks in Alta in Norway was originally staffed by 612 Company but was subordinated to the Orpo in the summer of 1942.

616 Company was on a smaller scale and was concentrated in France and Belgium. HQ and the intercept station were originally located in Melun but moved later to Sermaise. One short-range DF platoon of four Messtrupe was based in Paris, a second in Brussels. The unit in Brussels evacuated to the Hague in the winter of 1944; at the end of March 1945, it finally rejoined the company which had withdrawn to Uelsen. Further movements are unknown though it was the company commanders intention to reach WNV/FU headquarters.

615 Company was a special unit for the interception of VHF radio telephony including ground to air contacts. The company operated in France, Belgium and Netherlands, with a detachment in Norway, and comprised an HQ at Chartrettes and ten mobile Trupps. Each these contained intercept and mobile DF sections and was responsible for a frequency spectrum extending from 20 to 300 megahertz. The unit used the cover name Ursula. in connection with the intercept of VHF, a special discrimination section, known as Auswertung Ursula was attached to Aussenleitstelle Paris. All material intercepted by 615 company was handled by this unit. The Auswertung, which was composed of one officer and four Non-commissioned officer's as part of the Aussenleitstelle dealt with the local authorities in all matters dealing with VHF authorities. Auswertung Ursula reached Paris in December 1943. A fair amount of material was intercepted by 615 company, but very little success was achieved in efforts to locate VHF transmitters, as the mobile DF were unable to perform as efficiently as they could, without the help of long-range DF bearings. It was considered an exceedingly difficult task.

The detachment of 615 Company in Norway was ordered in 1944 on a mission to determine whether VHF was in fact being used in that area as this was considered a possible prelude to invasion. The unit travelled up the coast by ship from Kristiansand to Hammerfest with a view to intercept WT from the shore to ships and submarines as well as aircraft. The main result of this operation was the interception of no more than normal air and naval traffic, though a few WT transmissions directing supply dropping aircraft were apparently detected in the northern mountainous areas. No further action was undertaken against these stations in view of the technical difficulties and the unit seems to have concluded that WT was not much used in Norway. During the last weeks of the war, traffic instructions and VHF equipment of Swedish origin were discovered in Norway and an attempt was made to detect VHF traffic between Sweden and Norway in order to verify suspicions, but in fact no successes had been achieved before the end of the war.

=== Orpo units ===
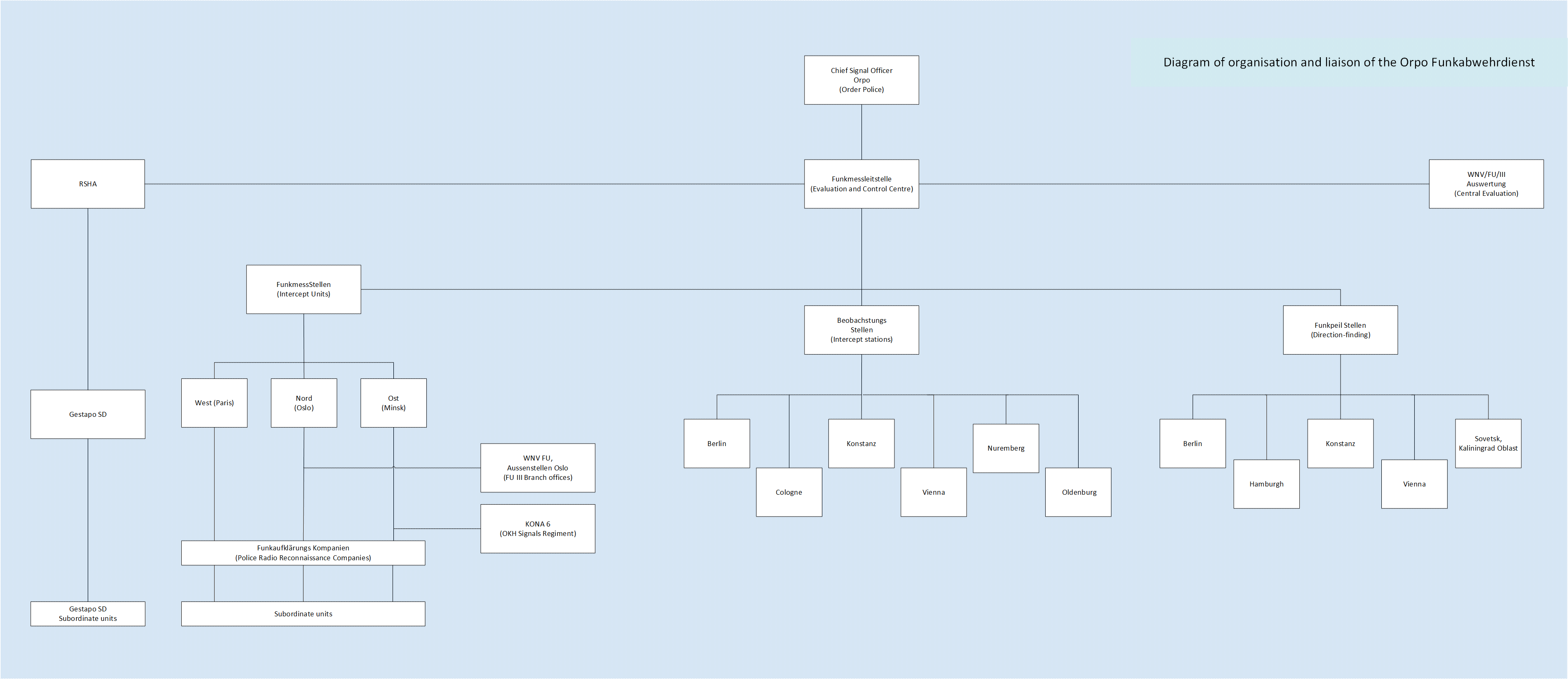
Hierarchical diagram of organisation and liaison of the Orpo Funkabwehrdienst

At the beginning of the war, the Orpo intercept stations (German: Beobachtungsstellen) were situated in Spandau, Cologne, Konstanz, Vienna and Oldenburg. These stations normally consisted of four banks of receivers, although the Berlin station may have been larger. Long-range SD stations already existed in Diedersdorf district of Berlin and Hamburg and stations at Konstanz and Vienna were completed at an early date. All these stations were administered by the local Orpo signals staffs but were directed operationally by the Radio Control Centre at Berlin. Few material changes took place in this organisation; the number of stations on Reich territory was not increased and there was no evidence that the existing stations were expanded to any large extent. Static long-range DF stations at Brest and Tilsit were added to the main network after the occupation of these areas. The principal development was the establishment of new B-Stellen in certain of the occupied territories.

Whereas the OKW Intercept Companies came into being suddenly at more or less strength, the equivalent Orpo units developed gradually from small beginnings through the expansion of newly developed B-Stellen in occupied areas. The final form of the police radio reconnaissance companies (German: Polizeifunkaufklärungskompanien) did not differ materially from that of the military units.

==== Norway ====
The final establishment of the police intercept company in Norway amounted to six officers and about 250 operators of whom, twenty were women. These were divided between a headquarters and an intercept station of ten banks in Oslo, an intercept station with three banks in Trondheim, and five mobile units, known as Operations section, with each section consisting of seven or eight vans. These were based in Tromsø, Trondheim, Oslo, Bergen and Kristiansand. No. 5 Operations Section in Kristiansand was staffed by OKW Personnel. The HQ in Oslo contained evaluation, plotting room and administrative staff. This HQ was finally called Funkmesstelle Nord. The company possessed no long-range DF units, although the Luftwaffe station at Fornebu was staffed by Orpo personnel. The Luftwaffe and naval stations at Fornebu, Jessheim, Nærland, Ørland, Bergen and Bardefoss were used for bearings. Although DF stations in the Reich could be called upon for assistance, they appeared to have been little used as the base lines produced were too short. There were direct telephone lines from the Norwegian HQ to Fornebu and Jessheim. The other DF stations in Norway were warned by wireless from Fornebu.

It is interesting to note that the company in Norway moved from an initial concentration on pure interception towards establishment of an extensive mobile DF organisation based only on a small fixed intercept establishment. In October 1940, when Oslo station consisted of two banks each were opened in Bergen, Stavanger and Kristiansand. These were closed in February 1942. Shortly afterwards, an intercept station was established in Alta, staffed by 612 Intercept Company and was taken over by the Orpo, but was subsequently close in March 1943, as results were negligible. A final experiment was made in establishing an intercept station in Kirkenes in 1943, but it was shortly closed, due to lack of results as well. It seems that results obtained anywhere outside Oslo and within Norway were extremely poor, while the presence of evaluation staff at headquarters, made the concentration of resources in Oslo desirable. By the end of 1942, there were no more than ten trained mobile DF operators in the country, but with training ongoing during 1943, it was not until the end of 1944 that the whole country was covered by mobile units. Two sections were established at first. One based in Tromsø, to cover the north, with the second unit based in Oslo, with a detachment in Drontheim to cover the south. After an unsuccessful experiment in mobile operations in Bergen, the units were withdrawn to Drontheim, where an independent section was established. Operations sections 4 and 5 were despatched to Bergen and Kristiansand respectively in October 1944. The units were not equipped with boats, but naval cutters were often borrowed when close-range DF bearings from the sea were desirable.

==== Soviet Union ====
The company in Russia whose headquarters became Funkmessstelle Ost, was established in Minsk in 1942. It consisted of two officers and one hundred and ten operators. It contained an evaluation section, with a twelve bank intercept station and a DF section. The DF section contained two portable long-range DF sets, one each stationed at Miau in Lithuania and Lemburg, and also close-range sections, staffed, but without vehicles. Since they were not available for mobile operations, the personnel of these latter sections were in fact employed as operators and provided about ten additional positions to the strength of the intercept station.

Theoretically, the function of this company was the interception and destruction of partisan WT stations. However, as the company was not equipped with effective mobile units, partisan transmissions took place from inaccessible points strongly defended by the armed bans which they served. This rendered traditional Funkabwehr methods inoperable. So serious was the partisans, that interception became a priority task, and the whole resources of KONA 6 was assigned to the task. The Orpo cooperated closely with KONA 6 and in effect became a subordinate intercept and DF station. Routine intercept reports and DF results were passed to KONA 6, who enacted the task of identification.

Funkmessstelle Ost and its subordinate intercept company withdrew to Lipke in July 1944, leaving the whole of its equipment to follow by rail. But the equipment could not be moved in time and was destroyed in Minsk. Lack of kit made work impossible and the company was disbanded at the end of August 1944.

Information is less complete concerning the Funkmessstelle West in Paris. Until 1943, that unit operated throughout Western Europe, thus covering the same area as the OKW intercept units, but even at this point there was a rough geographical division of spheres, with the Orpo paying particular attention to the Netherlands and the Paris area, while the OKW covered the remaining areas, although the division was only partial with both the OKW and Orpo operating to some extent throughout the whole area. After the formal division of responsibility the Funkmessstelle was responsible for the Netherlands and the southern half of France, except for the area around Bordeaux that was covered by 612 Intercept company. The interest of the Orpo in southern France was established even before the occupation, by its direction of Operation Donar.

==== Netherlands ====
The first Orpo units moved into the Netherlands in the summer of 1940 when the HQ was established at The Hague with an intercept station of four banks at Scheveningen. This was later expanded gradually to a maximum of ten banks. A close-range mobile unit Trupp was attached to the intercept station and a second was established at a later date at Groningen. The allocation of mobile units was centrally controlled by Funkmessstelle Paris with the result that cars were frequently moved from one station to the other or transferred to France. The strength of the Trupps in the Netherlands consequently fluctuated; at time each might have seven or eight cars and at other times they might be reduced to a single car, though, if difficulties were experienced through a shortage of cars, they were normally sent from France. In 1943, the HQ and the Scheveningen intercept station were transferred to Driebergen. In the autumn of 1944, the unit was moved to North Netherlands, but lost a substantial amount of its equipment on route at Zwolle.

=== Referat 12 ===
Referat 12 or Referat Vauck as it was colloquially known, was the primary agency or head office of the Funkabwehr and the principal cryptanalysis agency for the unit.

==== Formation ====
Referat 12 was formed when Wilhelm Vauck, a mathematician was ordered to report to In 7/VI in the spring of 1942, to attend a German Army Cryptography Course|cryptographic course (General der Nachrichtenaufklärung Training Referat). He proved to be a very able cryptographer and was selected to be head of unit (German: Referatsleiter) of Referat Agenten or Referat Agent. The referat was just being formed and had to be commanded by an officer so that its interests could be properly represented with the practical work and the current methods of other sections for approximately four weeks. Referat 12 was eventually named as Referat Vauck due to the large number of successful cases the agency processed, and that success became synonymous with Wilhelm Vauck.

==== Liaison ====
Referat Vauck achieved good results owing above all to Vauck's leadership and his personal cryptanalysis successes. Vauck demanded quick and close liaison with OKW/FU III and maintained that his section, by reason of the nature of its work, should have been permanently attached to that department. In order to ensure the closest possible liaison with the other interested authorities, i.e. Abwehr, Gestapo and the Orpo, personnel of Referat Vauck were detached to branches of wireless security intercept in Paris and Brussels.

Vauck became involved in the many quarrels between FU III, Abwehr, Gestapo and Orpo. FU III proved particularly obstructive, but relations with the Gestapo and Abwehr. Vauck already knew some members of the Abwehr and Gestapo on the Schulze-Boysen case. Vaucks work methodology was quicker and more flexible than the methods of FU II and was closely akin to the business-like operations of the German: Kriminalräte, lit. 'Criminal Counsellor' of the Gestapo. Effective liaison in western Europe was soon secured.

Among the first agent cryptographers to be posted to Paris was Dr Lenz. Later he was transferred to the Nice area where he was stationed at the beginning of the invasion. Through these postings a manpower shortage developed that reflected the wider chronic shortage of staff that Germany suffered from during World War II. Vauck together with his superordinate, Wachtmeister Köhler, who was second in command to Vauck and who was also considered an excellent cryptographer, became indispensable experts at Referat 12. Consequently, Vauck could not obtain his release from front-line service in January 1945, in spite of early promises which had been made to him.

==== Development of activities ====
When in spring 1942, Referat Vauck starting working to solve Allied agents' traffic, it was confronted with a completely new and difficult task. Success could not be achieved by merely using the normal methods of solving Army or diplomatic ciphers. The peculiar construction of agents' ciphers, demanded new methods of approach. Agent cryptographers had not only to be highly enthusiastic about their work and flexible in their approach, but it was also desirable that a percentage be expert linguists.

The earlies research work of Referat Vauck, carried out in close corporation with the evaluation section of FU III, was devoted to clarifying the use of Call signs and to ascertaining systems of Indicator groups and coding tables in different procedures. Material, in the shape of old messages which had been gathered in the past, was examined. Simultaneously a search began for possible sources of compromise within the various ciphers under investigations.

To supplement this research work an arrangement was made with the appropriate agencies to allow representatives of Referat Vauck to take part in important arrests and in the interrogation of agents. Owing to a shortage of personnel in the Referat it was impossible to take full advantage of this concession. The concession was granted because it was recognised that when an agent was arrested and no cryptanalyst was present, cipher material, that was usually well camouflaged, was not recognised as such and therefore could not be properly utilised. In addition, the material was often not evaluated correctly and suffered from forwarding delays. Occasionally ambitious amateurs would be involved. Other dangers surfaced when cryptanalyst was not present, agents may give false or imaginary cipher material. It was therefore recognised by Dr Vauck, that an involved expert improved the cryptanalysis of intercepted traffic. Once the value of Dr Vauck's assistance was accepted by the High Command, the Referat was frequently called to assist the Abwehr and Gestapo during the capture.

It became possible, with the advice of the Referat, either to turn round more agents or play back the agents' wireless personality using German personnel. Errors occurred in this field when signals personnel were not present. In Jan-April 1944 it was found that two Allied agents who had been turned round by the Abwehr were operating in a villa south-east of Bordeaux and were being handed clear plaintext for encipherment and transmission without any supervision.

Little is known about the operations in which Referat Vauck undertook. Dr Vauck stated of the last operation before the beginning of the Normandy landings, twelve links, operated either by German personnel or agents turned around, were running from France to England. Of these twelve links, the Germans intended in six cases to reveal in the course of transmission that the cipher had been broken and that they agent was being played back, i.e. being given text to transmit, after being caught and turned to work for the Germans on pain of death. It was hoped thereby to confuse the British Intelligence Service, so that they would begin worrying which other of their many links were compromised. Vauck never knew if the operation was successful.

==== Cipher techniques investigated ====
Even though it was not always possible for Referat Vauck to break into the cipher systems of Allied agents by purely analytical means, it was in many instances possible to solve and decipher techniques with growing success by using special methods. The employments of cryptanalysts for solving corrupt messages, i.e. for the correction of a text which had been deferred through bad reception or in deciphering was considered very valuable. Useful aids in discovering inroads into difficult ciphers was provided by other intelligence sources, e.g. WT traffic that had already been solved, by establishing what language was the cipher in, or by collating agents' code names, signatures and other magic numbers and letters as revealed by interrogation and traffic evaluation. Once these inroads were achieved they could be cryptographically exploited.

A special weakness of Allied agents' ciphers that was discovered was the use of books for enciphering. Usually only a minor inroad or other clue was enough to reproduce a piece of the cipher text, and conclusions could thence be drawn as to which book was used. In the case of one Allied transmission in the mid-1942, five or six French works of a text were ascertained, leading to the conclusion that the cipher book dealt with the Spanish Civil War. When it was discovered, all French books about the Spanish Civil War in the German state libraries of Paris, Madrid and Lisbon were read with the object of identifying these particular words. The book was eventually found after an extensive search. Great research efforts were always looked on as worthwhile. The greatest weakness in using books for enciphering lay in the fact that, once the book was compromised, an entire transmission could be solved automatically. The weakness existed even if the book in question could not be secured in the same edition or impression. It was still possible for Referat Vauck, although after considerable research to find the right place in the book and to secure fluent deciphering systems by means of conversion tables.

As a rule, the cipher discipline of Allied agents was good, with security breaches seldom committed, and if mistakes were made could usually be traced back to a weakness in the cipher system itself.

==== 1944–1945 ====
In the autumn of 1944, Referat Vauck, while still in Dorf Zinna, was transferred from In 7/VI to Group IV of the General der Nachrichtenaufklärung and later to Chi IV of the OKW/Chi and was called Referat X (15). The change was purely formal and did not affect the work of the section.

On 13 April 1945, Referat Vauck moved to southern Germany by train with the bulk of OKW/Fu. The train was on route to Bad Reichenhall and that was the last known location of the unit.

=== Subsidiary sources ===
The Funkabwehr did not neglect subsidiary sources of interception which might have proved valuable. A document dating from 3 November 1944 dealing with security matters under various headings and distributed to all fighting units states:

All reports regarding known or suspected secret transmitters, suspected radio cases and monitoring reports are to be passed without delay to the local Funkabwehr offices for appreciation and transmission to OKW/Ag/WNV/FU.

The document gives the address and teleprint code name of WNV/FU III and goes on to state that such reports should include date, time, frequency, location, type of traffic and arm of the service asking for the report. It ends with an exhortation to make such reports with the least possible delay.

This document appeared somewhat late in the day, but was in fact a re-issue of information and instructions of long standing. While it is unlikely that this obvious source of possible reports of illicit transmissions would have been neglected until the last few months of the war, there is actually no information to show how far service operators actually provided any information of value to the Funkabwehr.

To take an example of an operation of this type, where the extent of wireless amateurs were made use of by the Funkabwehr for their purposes could is now very clear. Gruppenführer Ernst Sachs, Chief Security Officer of the Waffen-SS and president from 1941 to 1944 of the Deutschen Amateur-Sende-und Empfangs-Dienstes (DASD), the German Amateur Radio Service, has stated that at the beginning of the war, a number of members of the DASD were recruited by Major Schmolinske of the Abwehr into an organisation known as the Kriegs FunkVerkehr (KFV) (War Radio Traffic) for Abwehr work. Since it is known that the Abwehr employed a number of amateurs in its own signals network, it may be assumed with some reason that these were in the main drawn from the KFV and that this body was in part at least a field for the recruitment of Abwehr wireless operators. At the same time Sachs stated that at least one of its functions was to check on illicit transmitters and that after about a year it was in fact removed from the Abwehr and incorporated into the WNV/FU III. A few captured letters of 1941 and early 1942 showed that certain amateurs were at the time being asked by the DASD to intercept suspect transmissions. Amateurs were also employed for other purposes by the OKW and some of them were issued with special war transmitting licences by the WNV/FU in order to carry these out.

=== Air cooperation ===
A squadron of Fieseler Storch aircraft fitted with close-range DF and photographic equipment was placed under the control of WNV/FU III in 1942. The HQ of the squadron was in Berlin and later Jüterbog, but the individual units, known as Kommandos were detached to peripheral points where they came under the operational control of the Aussenstellen. These Kommandos were intended to co-operate with the short-range DF platoons, but they tended to be employed in areas where ground units were unable to operate by reason of either roadless country in mountainous areas or the presence of partisan units. The majority were therefore stationed on the Russian front and in the Balkans where Kommandos were based at Belgrade, Sofia and Thessaloniki. Later one Kommando was moved to Udine to cover Northern Italy, but this rapidly ceased activity owing to Allied air superiority. After the German withdrawal the Balkan Kommandos were concentrated in Klagenfurt, but both they and the unit in Italy were transferred to the Eastern front in March 1945. One unit was tried out Fornebu in Norway for a short time and there may have been similar experiments in France.

Each Storch Kommando consisted of one aircraft fitted with two receivers, short-range DF equipment and photographic apparatus. A ground wireless link was also installed. The DF loop aerials were carried on the wing tips in a fixed position. Data regarding suspected illicit transmissions was passed to the Kommandos by the Aussenstellen or Intercept Company HQ in the same way as a to a short-range DF platoon. Once the ground wave of the signal was received, the aircraft flew towards the apparent point of transmission taking photographs. It then turned off and repeated the process on a different course cutting the line of the first. The transmitting station was looking for photographs taken at the point at the point of intersection of the two courses. If the station was located by this means, in partisan held areas the information was passed to the Luftwaffe for a bombing target. When cooperating with the short-range DF platoons, the chief function of the Kommandos was the detection of the ground waves.

The Storch Kommandos were afflicted by the shortage of petrol and equipment and Allied air superiority which interfered with all German airborne activities after certain point in the war. Apart from this however, it does not appear that they achieved very much success. In normal country they were less effective than mobile units on the ground, while in mountainous areas they experienced difficulties due to atmospheric and geographical factors. Probably the special conditions of the eastern front, with its large scale partisan activities in flat country, were the only ones which rendered this method of operations of practical value. Some confirmation of this is provided by the posting of practically all the Kommandos to the Russian theatre in the last stages of the war.

=== Communications ===
WNV/FU III was linked to all Aussenstellen by teleprinter and similar communications were maintained between the two Aussenleitstellen and subordinate Aussenstellen in their zones. The Orpo Funkmessleitstelle also had teleprinter connections with its subordinate Funkmessstellen, B-Stellen and DF stations. In areas where the intercept units were static for long periods teleprinter were sometimes installed at lower levels; thus Trondheim intercept station had a teleprinter link to the HQ in Oslo and the intercept station and HQ of 616 Intercept Company was linked to Aussenleitstelle West.

To a large extent alternative WT communications was installed to replace these teleprinter links in the later stages of the war when line communications became unreliable owing to Allied bombing. This had the added advantage that it enabled Aussenstellen and even the headquarters of WNV/FU III to communication direct with the platoons and other subordinate units of the intercept companies. Teleprinter links were maintained between the WNV/FU III and the Aussenstellen at Paris, Brussels, Lyon, Warsaw and possibly others. Within the intercept companies WT was the normal means of communication, though it appears that WNV/FU III was better equipped in this respect, than the Orpo units. Thus No. 2 Luftwaffe Special Intercept Company had WT links between the main station at Ecali and each one its subordinate one bank intercept stations, whereas several police units in Northern Norway had to reply entirely on the telephone for communication with Oslo. All the mobile short-range DF platoons were equipped with wireless, for intercommunication with the platoon. In most cases this was not employed except on training schemes; when on operations the telephone was normally used.

On all WT links fixed Call signs appear to have been used, while procedure was that of the service, Army, Air Force or the Police, from which the units concerned had originated.

Where the organisation had no communication of its own, channels belonging to other service were employed. The first choice was inevitably those of the Oberkommando der Wehrmacht if they existed since these were controlled by the WNV itself, but service, diplomatic and Abwehr communications were also used.

== Operational techniques ==
=== VHF Signals Monitoring Company ===
==== General operations of the VHF Company ====
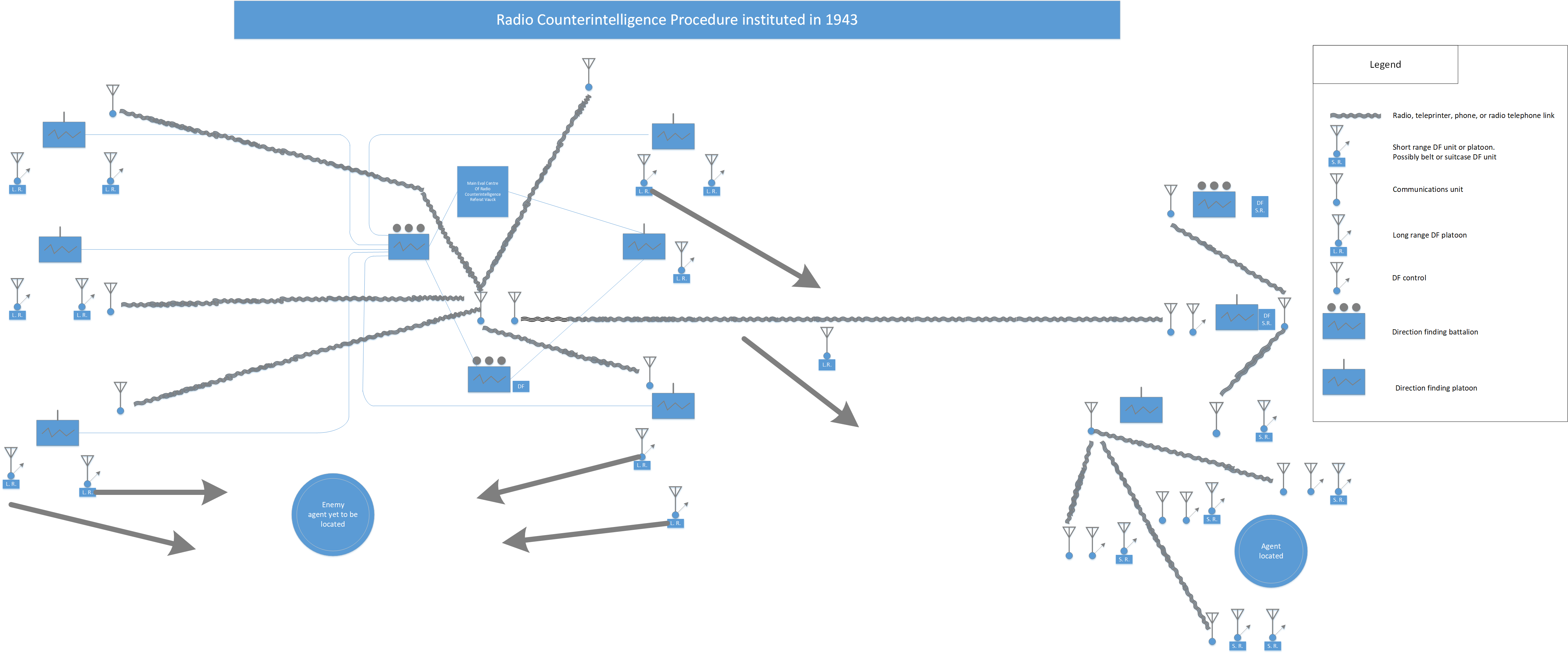
The counter-intelligence direction-finding procedure created in 1943 had a geographical component. The diagram represents the concept of direction finding units enclosing a target across featured geography, i.e. topographic area. In an area where the foreign agents were suspected of being located, a unit would conduct long-range direction finding operations using goniometric stations that would form a triangulation azimuth. The central battalion with radiating communication spokes could triangulate on a war theatre, a city, town or village. This is represented at the top left of the diagram. Once the long-range DF units had formed a rough azimuth, defining an area location for the agents, represented by the bottom left diagram, a short-range DF platoon would move into the suspect's area and this is represented by the bottom-left diagram on the left. Once the short-range DF was established it would locate the suspect, represented by the bottom right diagram. Operators with Suitcase DF units would them move into the area to triangulate on a particular apartment or house.

The VHF Signals Monitoring Company differed in operation and technique from the HF Signals Monitoring Company, as Very High Frequency (VHF) waves propagated differently from High Frequency waves. The existence of a Skywave was irrelevant to the problem of interception and DF in the case of VHF, as the work concerned itself exclusively with the quasi-optical waves which radiate from the source according to line-of-site. Radio waves in the VHF band propagate mainly by line-of-sight and ground-bounce paths. The definition of VHF meant wavelengths between 1 metre and 10 metres, at a frequency of between 30 MHz to 300 MHz. However, the Funkabwehr often ran transceivers that passed the 10-metre limit by as much as 2 metres. It was known by the Funkabwehr that the shorter the wavelength, the more the wave behaviour resembles that of visible light in the manner of electromagnetic radiation.

As there had to be a direct line-of-sight between the control station and agent station, the following conditions could be expected in a VHF agent operation:

- Immediate vicinity to the coast: Agent positioned on the coast, or on a high point of land in the vicinity of the coast, with an Enemy control station on an island occupied by the enemy, or on board a ship.
- Close to the Front: The breadth of the area along the front endangered by an agent using VHF is dependent on the elevation of the high point of land on both sides of the front, at least on one side.
- Up to 100 km distant from the area to which the enemy can generally send aircraft according to plan. From these considerations may be calculated the extent of the area to be covered by the Funkabwehr unit, looking for VHF communication.

The goal was to establish a large number of scattered intercept detachments, instead of a single central station. The more intercept personnel that were placed in operation, and the loftier their operational sites, the higher probability that an agents' transmitter with the area of possible operations would be picked up as soon as it started transmitting.

In regions with no elevated sights for line-of-sight, Barrage balloons with attached receivers or established in slow flying aircraft were used. Bases for the close-range field DF units were established in suspected areas. It is evident, from the enormous area of operations, that a successful directing of troops in the field can be accomplished only if good communications facilities were available. For this Radio communication was used.

==== Intercept and monitoring station ====
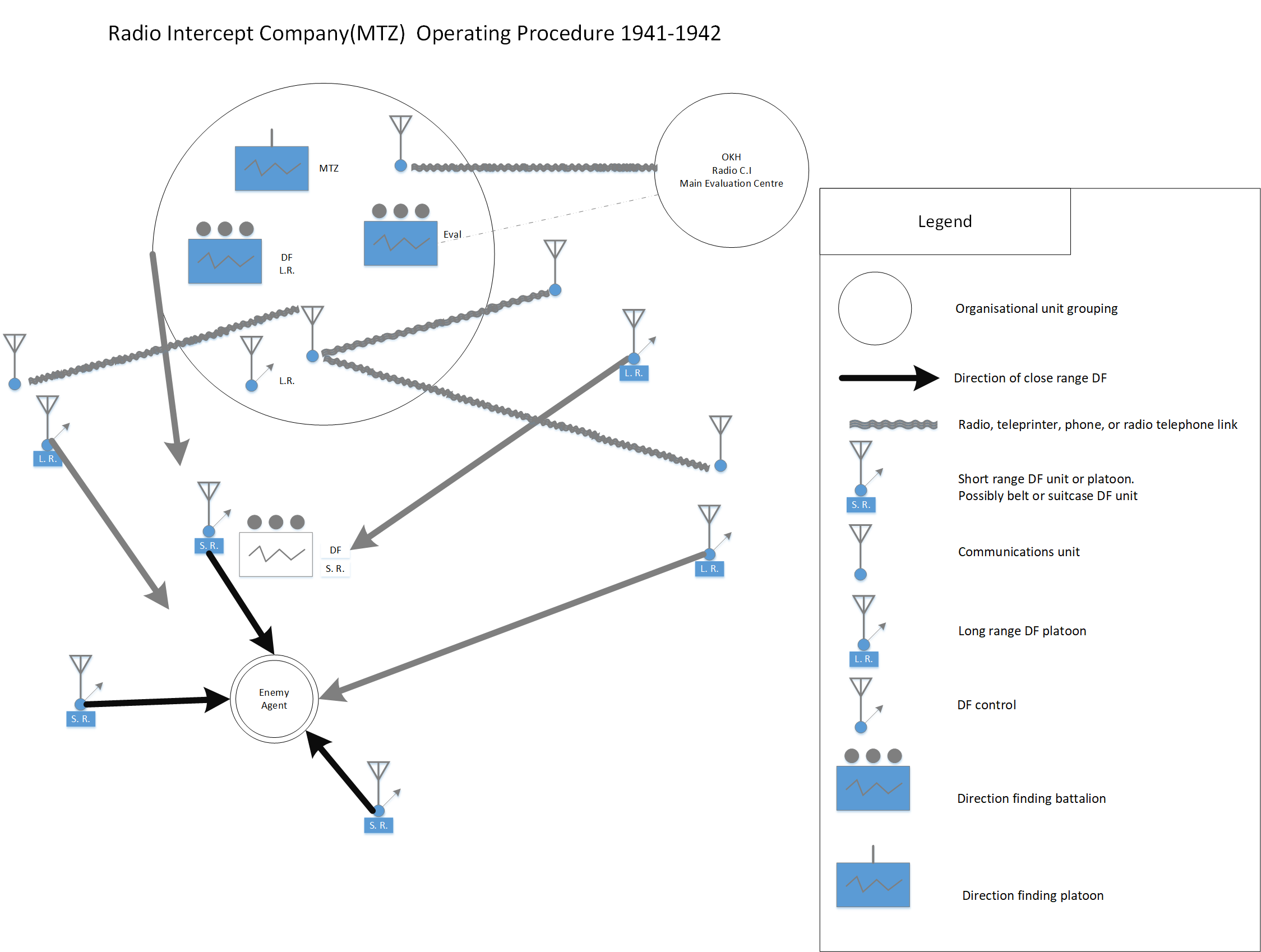
The operating procedure of a radio intercept company included a motorcycle messenger section, an evaluation platoon, an intercept platoon with two sections, a long range DF platoon consisting of four teams and a short-range DF platoon consisting of three teams

The monitoring stations had the following duties:

- To carry out general search services on Radio Telegraphy and Wireless telegraphy. When traffic was picked up, the monitoring station determined whether it was agents' traffic. In all situations in which it was not completely clear whether or not it was agents' traffic, tape recordings were made of the traffic and a linguist transposed it to a paper format.
- Current monitoring of traffic known to be from an agent by reason of information given by the analysis section. Should a monitoring station pick up not only the agent control station but the agent station itself, where the monitoring station had a DF unit available, then a DF bearing was taken immediately. If no DF unit was available, then a vehicle with mounted receiver would be dispatched immediately to check on signal strength and reception. In this manner, when a close range DF operation was to take place the next time the agent was scheduled to transmit, the DF units would already be established and positioned, such that a DF bearing could be calculated quickly, on the station.

The VHF intercept stations used the following equipment:

- 2 radio intercept receivers (Type V) -
- 1 SADIR VHF DF Receiver - This was a captured French unit.
- One of between-band receivers Fanò and Samsos FM or AM receivers. They were considered too scarce to give to all soldiers.
- VHF receivers, captured from eliminated agent stations. All units were eventually equipped with these.
- Recording device to record Radio Telegraphy traffic.
- HF transmitter for communication to company HQ.
- Additional auxiliary equipment.

Each team consisted of a team leader, who was a W/T operator and message centre liaison, three linguists and three intercept operators.

The intercept operators carried out general search with an intercept receiver. The linguists listened to already spotted and scheduled R/T traffic and kept logsheets of the text of R/T picked up by the intercept operators on search.

If the R/T traffic was blurred, it was often possible to pick it up with a captured VHF receiver, but could only be used for short periods as the machine became too hot and subsequently become damaged.

Every monitoring team reported to its HQ, the most important parts of the tuning and testing traffic, as well as all traffic between control stations and agent stations, including signal strength, other pertinent remarks, e.g. trips made in vehicles, DF bearings. This was passed to the analysis and evaluation section by Teleprinter or Wireless telegraphy. The tape recordings of traffic were sent to HQ by courier for evaluation. The Analysis and Evaluation section passed back to the monitoring troops the intelligence they derived from the mass of traffic sent in to them. The success of the VHF monitoring depended largely on the quality of the antenna installation.

==== Close range DF platoon ====
===== Organisation =====
A VHF close-range DF platoon consisted of:

- Two or three DF teams equipped with VHF DF sets of Type D, also an HF transceiver to communicate with headquarters.
- Three or four motorised intercept and very close-range DF teams equipped with VHF intercept receivers and very close-range DF sets (Belt and Suitcase types), along with an HF set.
- An intercept team which was equipped with intercept receivers and an HF communications transmitter. The transmitter was used to pass information and order to the DF teams and other intercept teams in the field.

===== Equipment =====
The VHF DF kit, Type D were transportable sets, usually mounted on or inside a vehicle. At the place from which one was to be operated it was taken off the vehicle and configured for ground use. DF equipment used Dipoles. From a good operational site, the equipment located a transmitter to within one kilometre at a distance of 60 kilometres. The motorised, close-range DF troops were equipped with VHF intercept receivers of the Type V configuration, and for very close-range DF work, they used belt DF and different kinds of suitcase DF units.

The Belt Direction finding unit was a small, flat apparatus which can be worn as a belt under a jacket or coat without being noticed. The power supply is small enough to be carried in the trousers pocket. The DF unit antenna consists of a thick, rubber insulated cable. This comes out of the DF apparatus along the right hip of the carrier, passes under the right arm and over the back of his neck, then under the left arm, down to the left hip. Operations conducted with the belt DF unit could only be carried out in the case of distances under 400 metres. Only direction could be determined, but it could not be sensed, possibly resulting in a 180° error.

The Suit Case DF unit resembled the close-range HF DF unit. The ideal instrument was one developed by the VHF signals monitoring company. It was constructed as follows:

The instrument was in a box that looked like the kit of a locksmith. The shoulder strap, with a wire running through it, served as the DF antenna. The DF operation could be carried out even more inconspicuously than with the former equipment, as the DF technician did not have to turn their face in the direction of the transmitter The null he was looking for was no longer in front or in back of them, but either to the right or the left. In the suitcase there were two receivers, one to listen to the control station, the other to listen to the agent station. In this manner, the DF technician could switch back and forth between agent and control with one hand and could easily determine, at any given time whether they were unable to hear the agent station for the reason that the control was transmitting, or whether the agent was transmitting and they could not hear them as they were too far away.

===== Operation of intercept search teams =====
If a VHF agent control station was discovered transmitting over a large area and the VHF agent transmitter has not yet been DFed, then the first part of the search procedure was to pick up the agent on a receiver, i.e. to find the area around the agent transmitter where it could be heard from the ground. To find this ground wave area, three or four intercept search teams were assigned through the search area on a predefined plan, during the period the agents were scheduled to be on the air. Once the search teams reached the vicinity in which the agent was heard in their cars, they would mark the area on the map and then leave. Initially operating with search teams was necessary, as, in contrast to HF operations, the position of the area surrounding the transmitter could not be found out by long-range DF. The HF DF could be configured to receive in the area of reception of the Skywave, but this was impossible with VHF DF.

===== VHF direction-finding =====
By the time the transmitter was scheduled next to be on the air, VHF DF Type D long range sets had been set up in the area in which the intercept search teams has identified. The Type D were considered extremely accurate and often resulted in fixes that enabled the belt and suitcase DF teams being immediately dispatched.

Immediately a bearing was discovered, each DF team reported it to all other DF teams in the area via HF transmitter. In the vicinity of each VHF DF one intercept search team was posted and another placed to the estimated location of the agent's transmitter. In order to accomplish results, the bearings taken had to be exchanged by all stations within 3 minutes after the agent began transmitting.

Intercept search teams had to determine the starting point for the belt and suitcase DF teams operations and provide ongoing support.

===== Very close-range operations =====
The control station plotted the DF bearings on a map and instructed the search team to move from their different locations towards the point of intersection using triangulation. Every vehicle of an intercept search troop was equipped with a close-range DF set. Once a team discovered the immediate vicinity of the transmitter, the very close range DF team left the car, which would drive away, with the occupant contacting the other search teams to inform them of the situation. Once the other teams were apprised, the other search ceased their search.

The immediate vicinity was classed as the area in which the use of very close-range DF apparatus was applicable for use. Such a team consisted of a DF operator and an assistant. Before the operation they would familiarise themselves the details of the neighbourhood landscape where the operation would take place. The assistant had the following duties:

- Act as a lookout and watching for suspicious people, proceedings and radio antennas.
- Protection for the team

Very close-range teams used work-belt DF sets and different kinds of suit-case sets to establish bearings at very close range. The bicycle DF consisted of a DF aerial and intercept receiver concealed in the bicycle frame. The suitcase DF was built into travelling bags, cardboard boxes, tool kits and violin cases. Using the equipment enabled the counter intelligence operator to operate close to or in the building where the agent was located without drawing attention.

If the agent who was betrayed by their traffic was considered suspicious, then everybody who was considered a suspect in the building would be arrested under all circumstances. If the very close-range operation went off according to plan, then the elimination of the agent was carried out in whatever manner the Funkabwehr or the Reichssicherheitsdienst agreed on. A unit of the Reichssicherheitsdienst or the Geheime Feldpolizei was called by radio or courier to be in readiness on the spot. They took over the actual arrest and house search.

The VHF intercept troops of the platoons were located near the agent transmitter during the very-close range DF operation. Their purpose was to observe the exact course of the agent's traffic and keep all logs of messages. In almost all cases an enemy agent would have a group of people protecting them, to watch for suspicious people and vehicles in the agent's neighbourhood. Camouflage of vehicles and people was therefore extremely important for very close-range operations. To facilitate this, vehicles were continually repainted, registration plates and silhouettes were changed on vehicles by making them longer, or wider, or changed of use, e.g. changing the vehicle from a taxi into a coal lorry, or milk wagon. Operators would change dress several times a day between civilian clothes and military uniform and smart, casual or work clothes depending on the area they were working in. Bicycles would have different wheels, tyres and fittings and colour changes.

The Direction finding men assigned to carry out the close-range operation were trained to be familiar with the characteristics of various transmitting aerials, as well as certain phenomena of screening and reflection. The following three drawings represent instances of screening and reflection that often manifested on very close-range DF operations.

====== Example one ======
Example 1. Direction finding screening example.

A building which is located between the transmitter and very close-range DF sets, acts as a screen and as a deflector. In DF position 1, no DF is possible. In positions 2 and 3 the DF points past the corners of the screening building and in an erroneous direction.

====== Example two ======
Example 2. Radiative direction finding

The aerial of the agents transmitter radiated in the direction of a telephone or power line with pylons. The very close-range DF creates bearings either along the wires or towards the metal pylons.

====== Example three ======
Example 3. Reflective direction finding

The aerial of a transmitter radiated in the direction of a wall or the front of a house. The very close-range DF point almost always to the point on the wall which would be reached by the imaginary prolongation of the direction of the antenna.

===== Signals platoon =====
The signals platoon of the company was weak in terms of personnel numbers. It constructed the communications net inside the company, connected the telephone lines into Telephone exchange, as well as the nearest Forward Control Station or Outstation of OKW/WNV/FU. It was the task of the platoon to main communications between the intercept teams and close-range DF platoons using HF radio links and indirect teleprinter links.

===== Analysis and evaluation =====
Evaluation was organised into:

- traffic analysis
- cryptanalysis and contents evaluation

There was no DF evaluation section, due to the DF bearings needing to be plotted by close-range DF platoons. The principal duties of the contents evaluation section were:

- to forward deciphered messages to the appropriate civilian or military unit to enable the effect of identifying and removing the treachery.
- to build a detailed organisational map of intercept messages to help identify the spy ring or organisation the agent belonged to, in anticipation of an interrogation of a captured agent.
- to compare logs and wire recordings of intercept teams and to clear any errors in those logs

===== Balloon operations =====
In order to identify the VHF transmitter as quickly as possible in countries or locations where natural elevations were lacking, and a VHF agent could only be heard within a short distance, it became necessary to use captive balloons. In the Netherlands, e.g. where it was necessary to find up to 30 operational sites to be sure of picking up the agent with VHF, according to methodology, one single captive balloon was all that was needed to achieve this.

=== HF Signals Monitoring Company ===
==== General Operations of the HF Company ====
Organisation of Radio Defence Platoon 615 intercepting HF traffic.

Every HF Signals Monitoring Unit had two operational sites, in the days of good performance. The purpose of this step was that one site would receive signals from an area with respect to the other site, that lay in a dead zone.

The intercept stations of the HF unit working in Italy were established in Ladispoli and on Mount Pellegrino. The 616 Intercept Coy, later called the 2nd Company, 1st Signals Monitoring Battalion, had its intercept stations in Fuhrberg and in Giessen and Brussels. The station in Brussels was moved to Bois-le-Roi, Eure.

The long-range DF units were always widely spread. The Italian units were located in Rimini, Cagliari, Ladispoli and Marsala. The long-range DF units of the 2nd Company were located in Toulouse, Brest, Hannover and Langenargen.

Close-range DF units carried out their assigned missions from areas called close-range field bases (German: Nahfeldstützpunkte). These bases were centrally located in the assigned area. The supply to these platoons was carried out through these bases and could be reached by direct telephone line. Radio communication was available in case of a breakdown.

==== Monitoring stations ====
The division of duties in an intercept or monitoring station was as follows:

Some intercept teams had the mission of clarifying suspicious traffic which had not yet been spotted through radio intelligence channels. Another group had orders to intercept and process traffic which the unknown traffic branch of the Analysis Sections of WNV/FU III, considered suspicious. On the basis of this systematic coverage these suspicious communications were either declared harmless and the coverage dropped, or coverage passed on to the intercept team whose mission it was to cover the net to which the now known traffic belonged. The third group covered the traffic which had been identified as to which net it had belonged to, or had been partially clarified. For this task the less proficient intercept operators were used. Every intercept team engaged in general search work and had with them a book containing a summary of all known traffic in that area, for reference.

The intercept station directed the long-range DF and close-range DF platoons, i.e. the DF command net used to order DF units on a given frequency and call sign.

Description of a Long range DF command net being established:

- Use of land lines

Next to each receiver was a microphone and a push button. When an intercept operator had a DF command to transmit, the operator pressed a button, that activated a red lamp that all intercept operators could see. This meant that the DF command net was in use at the time. The operator would then pass the frequency of the intercepted signal, call sign and any identifying characteristics of the signal over a party line to which all long-range DF teams were connected. If the traffic to be found was being received in sufficient strength the operator would transfer it to the party line. When the operator checked with the DF unit and established the fact that those who could DF the traffic had done so, the operator ended by giving over to the wire the exact time and serial number of that particular DF assignment. This process as described above could only be interrupted by so-called Blitzkommando. Blitzkommando mean that the DF command net was needed for the carrying out of a close-range DF operation.

- Use of radio communication

When it was no longer possible to direct long-range DF by a land-line, then radio was used. In principle the method was the same. It proved abundantly worthwhile to have the DF command net give the DF operators a running commentary of the traffic being direction found during the whole time of the transmission, to advise them whether the transmitter to be DFd was making a call, sending a procedure message, number or letter groups, or whether it had interrupted or broken its transmission. In this way, the DF-ing of some other transmitter that might have just come in on the same frequency was avoided, along with the radical errors in DF which could have resulted from such a circumstance.

The intercept stations used a second transmitter which gave the close-range DF teams in the field a running commentary on the agent traffic upon whose elimination they were engaged.

==== Long-range DF teams for HF ====
The work of the long-range High frequency DF men in the signals monitoring service did not suffer from the work of the long-range DF men of the H-Dienst. For purposes of Peilkammando (DF centre) communication by telephone, in every DF station there was a loudspeaker with an amplifier. Peilkommando messages were picked up by a message centre radio operator. Telefunken DF sets with an Adcock antenna for direction finding were used.

==== Close-range DF platoons for HF ====
===== Organisation =====
Close-range HF DF platoons consisted of three to six close-range DF teams with one intercept team. The intercept team had to watch on the frequency which was used for regular traffic by the transmitter to be eliminated. The purpose of this watch was to notify the close-range DF teams the moment the agent began his radio traffic, even it is came up at some time contrary to the regular schedule.

===== Equipment =====
These teams were fitted out with a close-range DF set made by the firm Kapsch, originally of Vienna, an intercept receiver C, HF receiver Radione and an agent's transmitter captured in the course of operations. The very close-range DF teams also used belt DF and suitcase DF sets.

===== Operations of close-range DF teams for HF =====
If the approximate location of the agent transmitter was not established by the long-range DF unit, which was inaccurate, the approximate position had to be found by search expeditions by using close-range DF teams, which were considered more accurate. For this purpose, the close-range DF teams were set up at distinct points throughout the area in question. One intercept operator in each team watched the frequency of the agent control station with the intercept receiver C. If the technician could deduce from the type of traffic emanating from the control station, that the agent was transmitting, then he went on a search action. To ensure the control station as well as the agent being DFd by the close-range section in the field, a second radio officer was given the Peilkommando frequency to watch. The Peilkommando was a transmitter that operated on a high output level and transmitted from the outstation, passing a running commentary on call signs, frequencies and messages sent by the agent transmitter being searched for.

All close-range DF teams were to seek out the area in question concentrically according to an established plan. They could not deviate from an appointed course unless they could hear or DF the transmitter they were after.

If a close-range DF section heard the agent transmission, it first had to determine if all it was hearing was the ground wave, i.e. the radiations in the near proximity, or the skywave. If the section heard the agent transmission, without fading out, then it was an indication they were close to the agent. As the close-range HF DF section not only had direction but also senses, then the DF team, working on the direction of the agent, could take further bearings.

The DF operator was required to fill out all data on a special form, while the team leader would mark a map of the area, that he heard the skywave, also to note the bearing taken in the proximity and project them on the map. An HF transmitter was used for inter-team communication. when a team discovered the vicinity of the agent station, it called other teams to inform them. The purpose of this was to ensure the agent did not take flight or change position with the simultaneous appearance of a number of vehicles, even though they were disguised.

===== Operation of very close-range DF teams for HF =====
If the DF operators were not familiar with the terrain they were in, and if the terrain could not be observed from an overlooking height, then the operators had to orient themselves exactly before starting a DF operation.

In a situation with a few houses, the agent's location could often be spotted by driving past with a close-range DF van. In heavily populated locations, the use of belt and suitcase DF teams was indefensible.

===== Operation with transmitter-seeking devices =====
Transmitter seeking devices were insensitive receivers. Using an electric motor the whole frequency band was automatically searched. Depending on the quality of the aerial used, transmitters were picked up which were within a radius of 400 to 1000 metres. It was possible for the operator to establish frequency, schedule and traffic type with that set, if he knew the approximate location and kept watch. By redesigning the aerial used, making it smaller and smaller if became possible in some cases to locate the agent by use of that set alone.

===== Fieseler Storch operations =====
Operations with the Fieseler Storch were carried out successfully in the Balkans and in Norway. They were used in terrain where close-range DF vans could not, or where partisans were located. The Fieseler Storch would fly around the position to locate it, not over it.

===== Camouflage and concealment =====
In each case there would be a group of people working for the agent and watching for suspicious people and vehicles in the neighbourhood of the agent's transmitter. The underground organisation would receive constant information about the appearance and behaviour of close-range DF vans as well as belt and suitcase DF teams.

As with the VHF intercept teams, ever-changing camouflage was used to disguise them in different environments. An example of a failed camouflage operation was discovered by the interrogator when the prisoner described an operation in Naples when a vehicle was disguised as a milk wagon. When it arrived in the locale, it was stormed by crowds of hungry people looking to buy milk. The vehicle had to leave Naples by the quickest possible route.

==== Signals platoon ====
The signals platoon of a HF signals monitoring company consisted of a telephone and Wireless Telegraphy (WT) squad. The telephone squad did the operating and trouble shooting of the telephone and teleprinter lines, as well as installing them. The WT squad operated the Kommando transmitter.

==== Analysis and evaluation ====
The analysis section was similar to the OKW/WNV/FU analysis section. The analysis section undertook the preliminary work for the OKW/WNV/FU analysis section. At regular intervals, a report of activity was created to send to senior staff headquarters.

=== Interception ===
There did not appear to have been any material difference between the operating methods employed by WNV/FU III and those employed by the Orpo; and while there was little contact between the two organisations while in the field, new methods tended to be shared by the two organisations.

The work of the Funkabwehr was based on general search which could not be immediately identified as either harmless or either known and already covered. The aim was to maintain one quarter of all intercept resources on general search; this figure was rigidly adhered to during the first half of the war. For example, the allocation of a station with four banks meant that three banks were for commitments and one bank was used exclusively for search. The later increase in the volume of commitments, which was not compensated by an equivalent increase in resources, probably took up a certain proportion of banks which would have been used for general search, e.g., the twenty banks of the signals intelligence company (German: Funkhorchkompanie) located in Jüterbog, no more than two banks were allocated for general search out of twenty.

Search bands of 100 kilocycles were employed and were centrally allocated to units by Berlin HQ in such a way as to ensure the whole spectrum was covered. However, the continual shortages in equipment, made the general use of narrow bands impractical, while a centrally administered overall cover of the spectrum did not make allowances for the local search needs of units located in widely spaced areas like France, Norway and the Balkans. In practice, therefore, the width of search bands varied considerably from 100 kilocycles upwards. The effects of this was to provide a more elastic and efficient system of general search, with the most resources concentrated on the busiest bands.

Search operators had considerable responsibility in being able to recognise and ignore unwanted signals. Schedules and call signs were passed by the evaluation section to facilitate the identification of signals, but in the main, the wireless technician relied on his own training and experience of different organisations. Conversely, the operator knew the characteristics of groups of transmissions which were being followed as commitments and tended to search for these frequencies, or signals of those types. This enabled loopholes in the search procedures to be created. An example of a loophole was when an Oslo transmission continued for a whole year, without being reported by any Funkabwehr station, although the intercept station in Oslo was with the surface wave of the transmitter. The transmission used procedure which was unlike that of the usual clandestine groups covered and so was ignored by the search operation.

New clandestine signals of a specific type, were if possible covered by general search until they were either identified by the evaluation section, or they were allotted as new commitments for search. As a general rule, it was the control station of new links that were intercepted first on general search and it was then the work of the operator to intercept and locate the answering signal. As a rough average, it took about two weeks between first interception of a new clandestine signal to intercepting the traffic of the answering station.

The use of split headphones was the normal practice for general search and commitments, i.e. where each operator, operates two receivers, the output from both being routed into a single pair of headphones, with one receiver used to intercept the control station, the other to intercept the answering signal. Each link was covered at all times by the same bank, while each bank was allotted links belonging to the same group and assumed to be using the same or similar operating procedures. Outside of promotions, transfers and casualties, each operator was retained permanently on the same commitments and over time became a niche specialist for the radio procedures of a particular group, moving from one group to another.

Intercept stations were normally on the small scale, on average about four to ten banks. The station at Jüterbog, established in 1944, consisted of twenty banks and was designed to host two intercept companies. It was considered the largest known to exist. The establishment of small listening posts of one or two banks was widespread.

Each operator was responsible for reporting required signals for DF operations. Operators copied all traffic and logged all procedures and chat sent by the clandestine station. Logs of traffic were passed to the evaluation section.

=== Evaluation ===
Evaluation, the American term, or Discrimination the British term consisted of the analysis of results submitted by operational units, the allocation of commitments to them and liaison with the relevant cryptographic and CE sections. The work was carried out at three levels. Within the operational units themselves commitments were allocated to individual operators and a rapid pre-discrimination of logs was carried out to extract information requiring immediate action at the station. Normally, the logs were then passed to the relevant Aussenstelle or Funkmessstelle where more thorough analysis was carried out. The Aussenstellen generally carried the main responsibility for discrimination and allocation of all transmissions taking place within their areas, though very complete details of all the results of evaluation including essential details of every item recorded was passed by the Aussenstellen to the central Auswertung at FU III. This normally took the form of a daily report sent by teleprinter or telegram covering the latest activity of regular commitments, new transmissions discovered and believed to be connected with local commitments and general search. A written report covering all activity was rendered monthly by each Aussenstellen. The central Auswertung kept a central index of all transmissions and undertook the more difficult semi-cryptographic work of cracking call signs systems and coded procedures. It was also responsible for the analysis of all general search reports and for the overall allocation of commitments to different units. A special subsection handled all DF results and carried out central allocation of DF network tasks.

This system invariably led to a fair amount of duplication since detailed records were kept at HQ, at Aussenstellen and in the evaluation sections of the intercept units themselves. In view of the wide extent and varying local conditions of the German organisation, it is not possible to say that a more rigidly centralised system would have been more effective. The amount of evaluation undertaken at each level varied considerably in accordance with local circumstanced and particularly with the existence of rapid and reliable communication between the Aussenstellen and the operational units. Thus, the station at Bucharest of No. 612 Company carried out most evaluation on the spot, passing its results and receiving its commitments direct to and from FU III; telegrams and reports passing between the two were repeated for information to the HQ of the company at Cranz, but the latter played a small part in controlling the work of its subordinate unit. In other cases, in order to avoid delay to both the Aussenstelle and the central Auswertung. In 1944, the units in Italy sent all evaluation signals simultaneously to FU III in Jüterbog, to Funkuberwachungsabt II (Radio Monitoring Department) in Vienna and to Luftwaffe No. 1 Special Intercept Company in Belgrade.

General search reports were analysed by the central Auswertung first from the point of view of procedure in order to eliminate unwanted transmissions. Those of wanted types were then compared with the schedules and daily call sign lists of known transmissions in order to segregate previously unknown items. These were passed out as new commitments as soon as sufficient data was available to initiate a regular watch. All WT channels covered as commitments were known as lines to each of which was allotted a separate number of four and five figures. Different blocks of numbers were allotted to the different nets or distinct groups covered. This numbering of commitments was rigidly centralised at headquarters.

Funkabwehr nets were distinguished on a geographical basis. Seven principal nets were covered:

- The western or LCA net. All links from the UK to France, Belgium, Netherlands, Norway and Denmark.
- The MBM net. All links between the UK and Czechoslovakia.
- The PS net. All links between the UK and Poland.
- The ZZZ net. All links between the UK and the Iberian Peninsula.
- The south eastern or Balkan net. All links were controlled from the Middle East.
- The Algiers net. All links were controlled from Algiers.
- The eastern or WNA net. All links working to controls in the Soviet Union

The three-letter groups by which the majority of the nets were generally known were usually the call signs of the first links identified in each. A card index was maintained, usually both locally and at the centre, of which activity, schedule and procedural characteristics of each line was recorded.

Allocations were carried out on the basis that intercept units were responsible for monitoring traffic in their own areas. Thus transmissions picked up on general search by one unit would often be passed as commitments to other units while the first station would be instructed to drop cover. At the same time, this was not rigidly adhered to when skip distance or other factors rendered more flexible allocation desirable, with most intercept units allotted some lines from several nets. Double cover was a general but not universal rule. Except in the case of Spain when both stations of a service were identified as being outside German-held territory, or the immediate front line zone cover was in most cases dropped unless the cipher used was one that was already solved.

==== Reports ====
A Reliable Report that has been damaged by being in water, removing the red strip from the header, with the diluted text recovered manually, probably by TICOM

The Auswertung of WNV/FU III, in conjunction with Referat Vauck, produced a monthly report on its current activities, under the title of VN-bulletins, also called Reliable Reports (German: Verlässliche Nachrichten). This contained detailed information concerning operational work in hand and the detection and capture of WT agents as well as cryptographic information and copies of solved messages. About seventy copies were produced and in spite of its high security grading its publication appears to have aroused considerable misgivings on the grounds that it was a danger to security since it was distributed to comparatively low rank individuals in the Funkabwehr.

=== Playbacks ===
Playbacks, the British term or the American term, G-V Game or the German term, Funkspiel was the transmission of controlled information over a captured agent's radio so that the agent's parent service had no knowledge that the agent had turned, i.e. decided to work for the enemy.

The Funkabwehr played an important role in the running of WT double-crosses. In some cases, more or less complete supervision of the case rested with the appropriate Funkabwehr unit, in others it was simply called in an advisory capacity with regard to technical aspects of the case. In all cases, the Funkabwehr had to be informed of the initiation of a playback, whether this was being run by the Sipo or by the Abwehr, and it had to be furnished with full particulars of WT schedules. In more cases, these would already be in its possession since one of its officers was usually called in after the arrest of a WT agent to carry out a technical interrogation. In at least one instance, however, the provision of full particulars did not prevent the Funkabwehr from locating and arresting an agent who was being run by the Abwehr III as an unconscious double-cross.

The Funkabwehr was never primarily concerned with the intelligence aspects of double-crosses, though where cooperation with the C.E. service was good, officers of the Aussenstellen were often more or less fully in the picture. Generally speaking the Funkabwehr units supervised the technical WT aspects of such cases and where Referat Vauck cryptanalysts were available at the Aussenstellen these handled the cipher details. In the Operation Nordpol case in the Netherlands, the Orpo unit was entirely responsible for transmission and enciphering although there were no cryptanalysts available. Plaintext messages were received from the Sonderführer Huntemann of Abwehr III but the actual working of the agents concerned was handled by the Orpo. This case, in fact, appeared to be one where cooperation between the Orpo intercept unit and the local Abwehr III unit was outstandingly successful. A very similar use was made of the WNV/FU III units in France by Abwehr III in running their double-crosses, the actual extent of supervision by the Funkabwehr varied considerably from case to case. Some difficulties arose here after February 1944, owing to an order by the WNV/FU III HQ that double agents who were not actually under arrest were not to be accepted for double-cross purposes by its subordinate units. In most cases the Sipo placed less reliance than did the Abwehr on assistance from Funkabwehr units. The playbacks run by Sonderkommando Rote Kapelle, of the Amt IV of the Reich Security Main Office, i.e. The Gestapo, were always carried out in close conjunction with the Funkabwehr, particularly from a cryptographic angle, but the whole of the Rote Kapelle case was exceptional in that all the C.E. authorities were concerned up to the highest level.

=== Direction finding ===
Control of the DF system was fairly rigidly controlled by the DF control and plotting section in the central Austwertung headquarters, but the system seems to have been on the whole to have been cumbersome.

Only in the Orpo DF network were the stations linked by line to a central control so that signals intercepted in the home B-Stellen could be put in line and simultaneous bearings obtained on the same signal. A similar system existed on a smaller scale in Norway, with the Oslo intercept stations at Fornebu and Jessheim. The signals thus transmitted to the DF stations were passed through loud speakers and the split headphone system was no employed. Where line communication between intercept and DF stations was impractical, the Orpo companies installed WT links. Fornebu station had links to all other stations which worked for the Orpo Company in Norway, and the intercept station in Minsk had links to its own DF stations. In the latter case the WT operators worked actually in the set room so that at least some direct contact was possible between the intercept and DF operators. These arrangements gave to the Orpo the great advantage that the expert operators could report the activity of stations wanted for DF direct to the DF operators whenever the required signal came up, thus avoiding waste of time on the part of the DF stations.

The OKW DF service was less well equipped with communications and except whereas at Treviso they happened to be located at the same site there was no direct contact between the intercept and DF stations. As an exception to this, the DF station at Loutsa had a direct telephone line to the set room at Ecali. In all other cases the DF stations had to work on their own, receiving with their assignments sufficient data to enable them to pick up the required station without assistance from the intercept operators.

DF assignments were sent out by WNV/FU III through the appropriate Aussenstellen or intercept company headquarters which usually had as a standing task, the provision of bearings on their own local commitments. Bearings were returned from the DF stations by the same route. This procedure made it impossible to ensure simultaneous bearings and also rendered the issuing of assignments a rather complicated process. At the same time it was possible to use only the DF stations in certain areas if this was sufficient. The Aussenstellen and intercept companies issued their own assignments to the DF stations under their control though these had a lower priority than requirements coming from Berlin; such assignments mostly consisted of items found locally on general search and believed to be connected with the commitments covered by the station concerned.

The use of DF stations belonging to other services was a feature of all parts of the Funkabwehr. Assignments for these were passed by FU III through the appropriate signal authorities, but in local areas such as Norway and Greece arrangements were usually made between the commanders on the spot to ensure the greatest possible cooperation and efficiency and in such cases requests to the other services were usually issued by the Aussenstellen direct to the stations concerned.

Plotting was carried out centrally in Berlin. The Orpo Funkmessleitstelle had its own DF control and plotting office which issued assignments to the Orpo units and plotting office which issued assignments to the Orpo units and plotted their results, but this worked in reasonably close conjunction with WNV/FU III plotting office, which was able to allot tasks to the other organisation. Funkmessstelle Ost, since it was dealing with material of local military importance passed their bearings to KONA 6 from whom they also received their DF assignments. In outlying areas, both the OKW and the Orpo units plotted their own bearings and in appropriate cases made use of them to initiate mobile unit action. It is not believed that the statistical methods of plotting were introduced. In cooperation with the local Abwehr III stations, Aussenstellen sometimes also arranged for the playing back of captured agents simply in order to be able to DF the control stations.

== Operations ==
=== Agents' operations ===
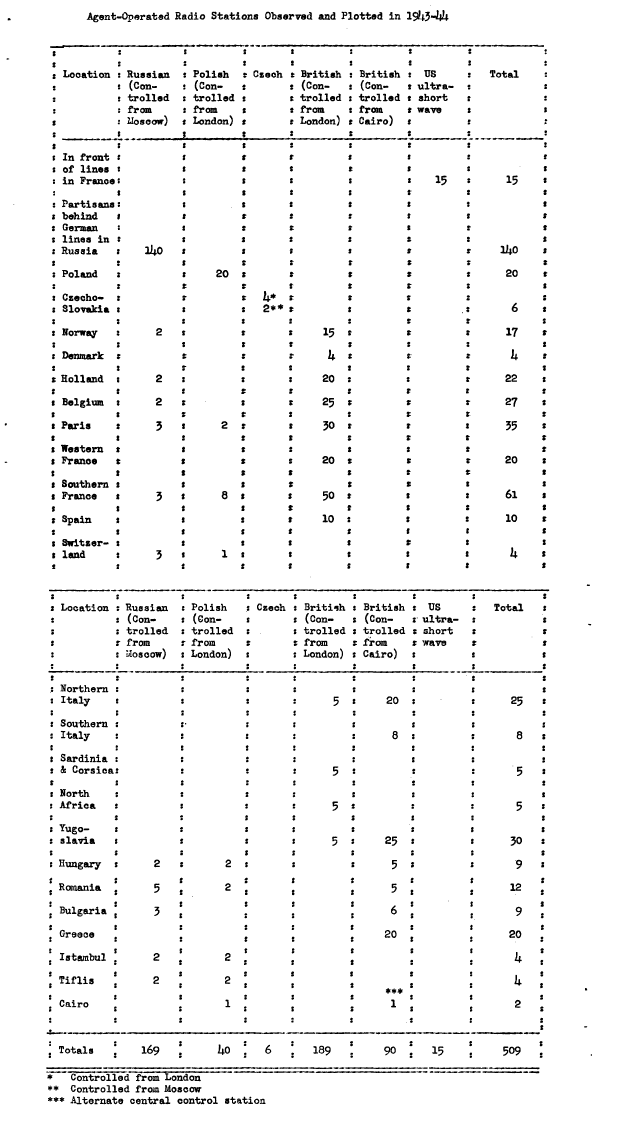
Approximate distribution of agent-operated radio stations intercepted in the year between 1943 and 1944. Great Britain followed by the Soviet Union had by far the largest number of radio transmitters.

Working with its own equipment, the Funkabwehr was able to effect about 30 direct arrests in 1941, 90 in 1942, 160 in 1943 and approximately 130 in 1944. In all, this amounted to some 410 cases. In about 20% of these cases, the civilian police forces assisted. Moreover, indirect arrests could be made on the basis of the information compiled by the final evaluation section. This source contributed approximately 140 additional cases during the same period. This, a total of 550 arrests stemming from operations were effected in four years.

In considering this figure of 550 arrests, however, one must mention the fact that there were at least 500 agent-operated stations that were under observation and had been located, but were never actually seized. There were at least twice as many suspected, unidentified agent-operated stations that had been intercepted at one time or another but whose exact number remained unknown.

One of the most curious and striking facts is that not a single agent-operated station could be located in Germany proper. In spite of constant and intensified observation and short-range plotting in the Berlin area, near the headquarters of the Adolf Hitler at the Wolf's Lair, at the V-2 rocket testing range in the Harz Mountains, all efforts were unrewarded, although there was definite proof that even top-level decisions and plans were being leaked by people in Hitler's HQ.

Among the most notable achievements of the Funkabwehr was the discovery of the anti-fascist resistance organisations in Germany that the Abwehr later called the Red Orchestra ("Rote Kapelle"). After the arrest of several Soviet agents in Brussels in June 1942, fragments of messages were found which provided clues to the hiding places of the codebooks, which were eventually found after a lengthy search throughout France and Belgium. The solving of numerous encrypted messages revealed the existence of a pro-Soviet (Russian) resistance group whose members held important positions in German civilian and military agencies and which also included two members of the cryptanalysis section of the German Radio Defence Corps proper.

=== Partisan operations ===
The expansion of the theatres of war and the methods of combat used in the Balkans and the Soviet Union had the effect that communication intelligence was burdened with additional missions which initially had not been expected and which led to the organisation of units employing special techniques.

In the occupied areas of western Europe and in Poland, the Funkabwehr had to observe and ferret out the constantly increasing number of radio agents, whereas in the Balkans and in the centre of the Soviet front, they had to deal with the partisans, who disrupted the lines of communication in the rear areas and who formed combat units of considerable strength which obstructed troop movements and interfered with the withdrawals in 1944. They, too, had to be discovered, observed and extirpated. The radio communications nets that enemy agents and partisans built up behind the German front were characterised by procedures that differed from those of the regular field units and therefore had to be counteracted by new intelligence procedures.

During 1943 on the Soviet Front, a commander of communication intelligence with several intercept companies, including two Hungarian ones and one evaluation centre, was given the mission of observing enemy radio communication behind the German lines whereas in the Balkans no special units were committed beyond those performing current operations against the front. The radio techniques used by the partisans in the Balkans resembled those employed in field radio traffic, while the Soviet partisans operated in the same manner as radio agents.

Partisan radio traffic was intercepted for the double purpose of gathering information for anti-partisan warfare and for obtaining insight into the enemy's over-all strategy as expressed by the missions and movement orders transmitted to partisans.

==== Soviet Union ====
Whereas in Ukraine and in the former Baltic states, the partisans were of minor importance until 1944, they went into action in the extensive wooded swamps behind Army Group Centre in Belarus, in the Pinsk Marshes and on both banks of the Dnieper and Desna River as early as the winter of 1941-1942. They constituted a force with which all rear-area headquarters, supply, transportation and signal units had to contend with every day.

At first the partisan units were improvised by communist fanatics and individual officers who recruited able-bodied men, women and children of the civilian population and countless Red Army soldiers whom the rapidly advancing German combat forces had left behind unnoticed during 1941. On 3 July 1941 Joseph Stalin proclaimed over the radio:

In the areas occupied by the enemy we must organise partisan detachments to fight the invader. We must extend the partisan war everywhere for the purpose of blowing up bridges and roads, damaging telephone telegraph lines, and setting fire to forests, warehouses, and rolling stock. In the lost territories we must make life unbearable for the enemy and all their collaborators; we must pursue and destroy them step by step and frustrate all their activities. During withdrawals all valuable property that cannot be taken along must be destroyed without exception.

These bands soon developed into formidable, well trained units. Radio communication became increasingly important for forwarding mission orders and received reports and requests for supplied by return. Both men and women were selected and provided with excellent training in special radio communication schools. Radio operators were parachuted into areas assigned to them, or else landed on partisan airfields with short-wave transceiver sets the size of a cigar box. Their radio communication protocols to e.g. army group headquarters or Moscow, adhered to standing procedures, and their radio discipline and cryptography were far superior to those of ordinary field radio operators. Finally message length was kept short and frequent changes of procedure, and constant improvement made the communication difficult to intercept. Employment of the short-wave frequencies caused difficulties in reception and in DF operations.

The increase in organised raids and surprise attack upon infrastructure, e.g. vehicles, railways, towns and teleprinter communications resulted in an energetic punitive measures, which were beyond the scope of the area security detachments, which consisted of second-rate troops, police forces and Hungarian units. During the autumn of 1943, a monthly average of 2,000 poles and 300 cables were cut down or demolished along the likes routes with which the two signal regiments of an Army Group Centre maintained between army group headquarters, then four armies and the rear areas. Casualties were correspondingly high. The army communication intelligence units observed the partisan traffic behind the front lines and built up a picture of the partisan units, but the results were of local significance only and provided basic information for countermeasures. Short range DF teams were sometimes used to track down partisan groups. Occasionally German intercept units succeeded in deceiving Russian aircraft loaded with supplies for the partisans with deceptive radio and light signals, thus causing then to drop their cargo or land at the wrong point.

By committing units up to Division size, important lines of communication were cleared of partisans, but the Germans were never able to eradicate this danger from the extensive areas which had poor road facilities.

The insecurity in the rear areas was so serious that Army Group Centre designated a special partisan warning channel on which an ambushed or threatened unit could send out emergency calls. However, this was in vain, as by blocking the route of withdrawal along the Berezina River and at other points, they effectively contributed to the German disaster for Army Group Centre in June–July 1944.

German High Command was greatly interested in the degree of cooperation between the Russian combat and the partisan forces. Before any major operation or offensive, the partisan units were given combat missions designated to disrupt the German lines of communication. By intercept and evaluation these orders, German units were able to deduce the directions in which the Soviet partisans intended to attack. The partisan units behind the front kept pace with the westward advance of the Soviet forces and some of them did not join up with the latter until they had almost reached the German frontier. The movements and the direction taken by these units, as indicated by intercept radio messages, often furnished valuable clues to the German counter-intelligence units.

The Soviet radio traffic from the strategic intelligence sections clearly revealed plans. These were teams, eight to twelve strong, operating 10 to 60 miles behind the German front lines. Their mission was Industrial espionage on e.g. supply depots, lines of communication and locations of garrisons. An example of espionage was conducted by Major Buchmostov, whose reports were observed for many months in 1943-1944. Buchmostov ran an intelligence section behind the 3rd Army front near the Vitebsk area. Of strategic importance were small spy teams dropped from Soviet planes far behind the German front. These small spy teams consisted of one radio operator and three to five men, with those operating on Polish territory of Polish nationality; those dropped in German territory were former German prisoners of war. The intercepts provided excellent radio intelligence as to the Soviet intentions.

German signals intercept units were specifically trained for this technically complicated work and operated in close cooperation with the other German intercept units.

==== Poland ====
The radio operators among the Polish partisans and in the Polish resistance movement were also outstanding. The resistance organisation, with headquarters originally in Warsaw, where six of its radio stations were neutralised by the Funkabwehr, was in contact with the central radio control station of the Polish government-in-exile in London. Within Poland the organisation followed the lines of the former military district subdivisions. The itinerary of the Polish troops subordinated to General Władysław Anders after their expulsion from Kuibishev, Soviet Union, through the Near East to Cairo and from there to North Africa and Southern Italy was observed and reported by radio counter-intelligence.

The Polish partisans were as effective as their Soviet counterparts in harassing German lines of communication. Their activity steadily increased up to the time of the Warsaw Uprising commanded by General Tadeusz Bór-Komorowski during the autumn of 1944, as the Soviet Union armies were approaching the city. Numerous radio messages were sent by the insurgents, e.g. Armia Krajowa to the Polish 1st Polish Army and 2nd Polish Armies then fighting with the Soviet Union in an attempt to induce them to intervene. The traffic with London at the time dealt with plans for supply by air.

During the uprising, Polish partisans who had advanced from wood south of Modlin attacked the evaluation centre of the German 9th Army located on an estate west of Warsaw. After heavy fighting, during which five officers and many non-commissioned officers and enlisted men were killed, some panzer troopers and liaison planes loaded with bombs, bombed the insurgents and relieved its remaining personnel in the evaluation centre.

==== Balkans ====
In this theatre, the partisans became such a threat to the occupying power that, after about autumn 1943, when the observation of British forces in the Near East and in eastern North Africa was no longer a source of much interest, practically all communication intelligence personnel were switched to anti-partisan operations. The partisans' radio techniques and codes were simple and easy to solve, indeed much easier than the Soviet and Polish systems. On the other hand, the Balkan partisans did maintain a high degree of radio discipline and refrained from transmitting in the clear. A large variety of shortwave radio sets were in used, ranging from locally produced equipment to that furnished by the Allies. Because of the threat of partisan attacks and the technical difficulties encountered in mountain terrain, Germany was unable to use direction finding. Their employment was unnecessary because any data referring to localities could be obtained through message analysis.

The radio traffic of the resistance force subordinated to General Draža Mihailović was observed from the beginning of 1942, first from Athens, later from Belgrade. Radio intelligence provided information on the organisational structure, composition and concentration areas of this force, also, its plans for future operations, but more often those which had recently been completed, including combat actions, the course of the front lines, shifting of forces, temporary disbanding and subsequent reactivation of combat units; deserters; projected and completed British supply flights, quantities of airdropped supplies, landing fields and their beacon lights; activities of the British and American military missions; behaviours of the Italians and Bulgarians; and finally Mihailović's attitude towards his various enemies, such as the Germans, Milan Nedić, Tito, the Croats, Ustashe, Montenegrins, Albanians and others.

As early as mid-1943 Mihailović recognised Tito's threat to Serbia and from then on he fought against Tito's units whenever they devastated Serbia in their raids launched from Croatia. Radio intelligence established how these military missions organised the flow of supply to the resistance groups, first by air and later by sea from Allied held southern Italy, after the Allied invasion of Sicily. In some months as much as 1000 tons of supplies were dropped. The military missions probably also exercised some influence on the course of operations and was evidenced by Mihailović's precise instructions to his senior commanders concerning their conduct toward the military missions and by complaints submitted by the latter. The Funkabwehr observed that, after similar military missions had been sent to Tito, those with Mihailović were recalled, at first gradually and then more and more rapidly. Mihailović was not so concerned about American forces, but when their departure was followed by that of the British who had hitherto been his chief military and political supporters, Mihailović was dismayed and his subordinates were stunned. The continued support of the Yugoslav government-in-exile in London and of King Peter II of Yugoslavia offered little consolation. After they had been abandoned by the British and Americans, some of Mihailović subordinated commanders were ready to sign an armistice agreement with Germany and to join them in the defence of Serbia against Tito. However, Mihailović remained true to his principles. His radio message read:

Our enemy number one is the occupying power, Germany and all our efforts should be directed against this enemy.

He continued to profess his loyalty to England and the United States and the democratic ideals of freedom, and until the end he exhorted his senior commanders to remain true to the cause and to carry on the struggle against the Germans.

In early 1943, the volume of Tito's radio traffic was still small, but it increased rapidly and soon exceeded that of Mihailović, which declined together with his waning star. Since Tito's radio technique was as simple as that of Mihailović, the Funkabwehr was able to achieve equally complete coverage. Every detail about him and his activities became known to his enemies as well as the fact that he considered the Government of Croatia, the Ustashe, Mihailović, Milan Nedić and others his bitter enemies. As in the case of Mihailović, the struggle against Germany has top priority with Tito. In politics, Tito recognised only two factions: democratic, which included all those were on his side, and fascists were those not on his side, whether they were Germans or Serbian royalists, e.g. the Chetniks.

In addition to providing information on the confused political situation in the Balkans, the Funkabwehr and German communication intelligence units also furnished definite proof of the duplicity of Germany's allies and satellites, less on the part of the Bulgarians than on that of the Italians. It was characteristic, e.g. that the Italians accepted an offer to exchange one of their generals, who had been captured by Mihailović troopers, for a field artillery gun and ammunitions. Towards the end of 1943, the Bulgarians also began to deal in kidnapping and double dealing.

Finally, the Balkan partisans played a similar and perhaps even more important part against the weak German occupation forces than their counterparts in White Russia. Even though radio intelligence did provide reliable information for effective counteraction, the means to enforce any such measures were not available.

During the belated German evacuation of the Balkans at the end of 1944, the partisans inflicted heavy casualties on the retreating Germans.

=== Operations in neutral countries ===
==== Spain ====
The most important effort of the Funkabwehr on neutral territory was in Spain. The first steps were taken to set up an intercept organisation on Spanish territory in early 1943, and by summer 1943 was in operation with twenty-three staff. These were Wehrmacht personnel, but held diplomatic cover and worked in civilian clothes; equipment was taken in, in Embassy baggage and operations was carried out in diplomatic or consular buildings.

The organisation in Madrid held the status of an Aussenstelle, or branch office of the WNV/FU. As such it dealt directly with WNV/FU I, concerning administration and personnel, with FU II concerning equipment and FU III in technical intercept matters. The chief of the Aussenstelle was locally subordinate to Oberstleutnant Walter von Rohrscheidt, the leiter of Abwehr II in Spain. The unit was equipped with a DF station and with a unit of close-range mobile units camouflaged in civilian cars which also carried suitcase-sized DF sets built into the cars. The intercept strength in Madrid was unknown.

The allocation of tasks to the unit was carried out in the normal way by Berlin. The station had an important general search commitment and was also used to monitor transmissions emanating from all points in south west Europe with particular attention being paid to the traffic of Allied agents in France and Spain working to North Africa or the UK. The DF station was particularly important in locating these agents since accurate results could not be ensured by Reich stations owing to the awkward position in Spain in relation to their base lines. In each case of an allied agent transmitting in Spain, instructions were issued by Berlin as to whether mobile unit action was to be undertaken. The object of this procedure was to supply the German Foreign Office with evidence on which to approach the Spanish government with a view to obtaining the arrest or expulsion of the agents.

The most interesting aspect of these activities was the position of the Aussenstelle Madrid and the Francoist Spain Government in respect. The Spanish government and police services were not only aware of the presence of the Funkabwehr in Spain, but also rendered assistance. There is no doubt that an extensive exchange of information took place, with the Spanish cooperating closely with the Abwehr III in the pursuit of agents and when WT traffic and cipher material was found as a result of raids, this was handed to the Germans, while the latter kept a good deal of information to themselves, went so far as to hand over actual decodes of messages to Funkabwehr personnel, that were of interest to them. On at least one occasion the Spanish government requested the Funkabwehr to cover certain de Gaullist traffic and this request was complied with. Spanish republican traffic was another sphere in which the German unit assisted its hosts.

The final stage in cooperation was reached in the autumn of 1944 when discussions took place with the Spanish government with a view to establishing a combined intercept station. The Francois Spanish side agreed that six well trained pro-German operators and two sets should be provided. This was welcomed by the staff of the Aussenstelle who intended to employ Spanish operators on known commitments thus releasing German personnel to increase search cover. The sanction of Berlin was asked for this arrangement, but it was not known if the arrangement was ever carried out.

==== Turkey ====
A Funkabwehr organisation existed in Turkey on similar lines to that in Spain though it was in every respect on a less impressive scale. It appears to have been established in July 1943 and its purpose was to the interception of traffic in southern eastern Europe and particularly links going into Turkey itself. There was an establishment of four banks in Ankara under the direct control of Berlin and operated under diplomatic cover, but did not have the status of an Aussenstelle.

Axis relations with Turkey being very different from those with Spain as the unit did not receive assistance from the Turkish authorities and had to operate with great circumspection. There is no indication that the unit possessed either DF or mobile equipment; the setting up of a special unit mission in Turkey suggests that this is not the case.

For obvious reasons Turkey was of particular interest to Luftwaffe No. 2. Special Intercept Company's sphere of responsibility was the southern and eastern Balkans, and during 1943, two special operations were organised by this unit with Turkey. A number of Allied agent stations were found by DF to be in Turkey. An NCO was smuggled into Turkey in the early summer 1943 with a portable DF unit and a close-range intercept receiver. The NCO's function was to pinpoint a number of these agent stations with a mission that was to last two months. The second operation started in September 1943, when three NCO operations were sent under commercial cover and by arrangement with the Abwehr, to establish an intercept unit in Istanbul. This unit was in operation for some months as a detached intercept station under the direct operational control of the company HQ in Sofia.

==== Operation Donar ====
Operation Donar took place in the unoccupied zone of France in August 1942. The presence of a number of Allied WT agents in this area being known as the result of DF operations, the German government obtained the formal consent of the government administration of the Vichy France to despatch a mobile unit expedition to close them down. The operation was directed by the Sicherheitspolizei and the technical equipment and personnel was provided by the Orpo Funkabwehrdienst in Paris. The expedition was on a large scale, with all the Orpo mobile units in France taking part with some units from the Netherlands temporarily withdrawn to take part in the operation. These were divided into a number of small groups each of which was accompanied by a small Sicherheitspolizei unit and, in some cases, also by an Abwehr III detachment. Each group operated in a different area and in this way the whole of unoccupied France was covered.

The organisation and particularly the cover arrangement of the expedition appear to have been extremely faulty. Few French-speaking personnel took part and the steps taken to preserve secrecy were very ineffective. Consequently, results were smaller and did not come up to the expectation of the promoters of the operation. Six clandestine stations were located and closed down. The operation was closed down just before the German entry into the unoccupied zone.
