= Wilhelm Vauck =

- Picture of Wilhelm Vauck while working with a Slide rule.
- Born: 8 June 1896; Neustadt, Dresden, German Empire
- Died: 8 December 1968 (aged 72); Bautzen, East Germany
- Citizenship: German
- Education: TU Dresden
- Scientific career
- Fields: Mathematics; Physics
- Doctoral advisor: Gerhard Hermann; Waldemar Kowalewski

Wilhelm Vauck (born 8 October 1896 in Neustadt, Dresden; died 8 December 1968 in Bautzen) was a German mathematician, physicist and university lecturer in physics and electrical engineering. During World War II, Vauck was the director of the agents Referat within the Funkabwehr, the German Armies radio counter-intelligence organisation. As an anti-nazi, Vauck's work on the discovery of the Rote Kapelle anti-fascist resistance group during World War II, burdened him deeply until the end of his life.

== Life ==
After World War I finished, Vauck undertook study of mathematics and physics at the Technical University of Dresden. In 1922, he passed the exam for a higher education office, and two years later, under supervision of Gerhard Kowalewski, Vauck was promoted to Dr. phil with a thesis titled A generalisation of Bolzano's continuous but non-differentiable function (German: Versuch einer Verallgemeinerung der stetigen nirgends differenzierbaren Funktion Bolzanos) which is within Mathematics Subject Classification 26 Real functions.

Vauck's first career position was as a teacher at the secondary school in Thum and then from 1926 as a teacher at the secondary school in Bautzen. After the war from 1948, he became a teacher in Bautzen and later became a lecturer in physics and electrical engineering at the engineering school in Bautzen.

== Military career ==
During his military career, Vauck held the rank of Oberleutnant. In the spring of 1942, Vauck was ordered to report to In 7/VI to attend a cryptographic course. He proved to be a very able cryptographer and was selected to be Head of Unit (German: Referatsleiter) of Referat Agenten or Referat Agent in OKH/In 7/VI/12 or Referat 12 of In 7/VI. This Referat had just been formed and had to be commanded by an officer so that its interests could be properly represented to other agencies. Vauck spent four weeks becoming familiar with the practical work of the unit. The Referat would eventually be called Referat Vauck, due to its successes discovering anti-fascist organisations.

== Red Orchestra ==
Vauck lead the team at Referat 12 that would eventually discover the German anti-fascist network that would later be called the Red Orchestra (German: Rote Kapelle) by the Abwehr. Dr Vauck succeeded in decrypting around 200 messages of the Rote Kapelle. The first discovery of the network was the discovery of the woman agent, Rita Arnould on 12–13 December 1941, which later led to the locating of radio operator Johann Wenzel, the second discovery. On 15 July 1942, the discovery that lead to the full realisation of the size and complexity of Rote Kappelle was made, when a message was deciphered. On that date, Vauck successfully deciphered a message. It had the format:

KL 3 DE RTX 1010-1725 WDS GBT FROM DIREKTOR TO KENT PERSONAL:

that was decoded into;

KENT from Director Personal. Proceed immediately Berlin three addresses indicated and determine causes failure radio connections. If interruptions recur take over broadcasts. Work three Berlin groups and transmission information top priority. Addresses: Nwuwestend, Altenburger allee 19, third right; Coro Charlottenburg, Frederikstrasse 26a second left, Wolf-Friedenau, Kaiserstrasse 18 fourth left. Bauer. Call name here "Eulenspiegel" Remind Bauer of book gave to Erdberg as present before the war and of play Till Eulenspiegel. Password Director. Report progress 20 October. New (repeat new) plan in force for three stations.

When Vauck decrypted this message, it was forwarded to Reich Security Main Office IV 2A, where they easily identified the persons living at the three addresses and from 16 July 1942 were put under surveillance. Unknown to Vauck, there was also a informer working in Referat 12 in Vauck's team, Corporal Horst Heilmann, who was supplying Harro Schulze-Boysen (Coro) with intelligence. Heilmann tried to contact Schulze-Boysen but was unsuccessful and left a message with his wife to phone him back. Schulze-Boysen eventually did this, but Heilmann was absent. However Vauck answered the phone and when he requested the name of the caller to take a message, and was met with Schulze-Boysen, who was already identified as CORO, the deception was revealed, and Heilmann was arrested.
