= Lipke =

Lipke is a surname. Notable people with the surname include:

- Adolph Lipke (1915–1984), South African cricketer
- Jānis Lipke (1900–1987), Latvian rescuer of Jews in Riga during World War II
- Lipke Holthuis (1921–2008), Dutch carcinologist
- Paul Lipke (1870–1955), German chess master

Lipke is also the former German name of what is now Lipki Wielkie, in Gorzów County, Lubusz Voivodeship, western Poland.
